= Ernest Davies (Stretford MP) =

British politician (1926–2020)

London Borough of Southwark Councillor for Lyndhurst Ward, Dulwich
- In office 1978–1982

London Borough of Southwark Councillor for Alleyn Ward, Dulwich
- In office 1974–1978

Member of Parliament for Stretford
- In office 31 March 1966 – 18 June 1970
- Preceded by: Samuel Storey
- Succeeded by: Winston Churchill

Personal details
- Born: 25 October 1926 Nuneaton, England
- Died: 8 March 2020 (aged 93) Nuneaton, England
- Party: Labour
- Spouse(s): Margaret Gatt (m. 1956; div. 1967) Patricia Bates (m. 1972; div. 1980)
- Education: Westminster Training College; University of St Andrews; St John's College, Cambridge
- Military career
- Allegiance: United Kingdom
- Branch: Air Force
- Service years: 1942-1943
- Conflicts: World War II

Dr Ernest Arthur Davies MInstP CPhys JP (25 October 1926 – 8 March 2020) was a British Labour Party politician. He served for one term as Member of Parliament (MP) for Stretford in North West England from 1966 to 1970, when he was defeated.

== Early life ==
Davies was born in October 1926, the son of Dan Davies and Ada (née Smith) in Nuneaton. He was educated at Coventry Junior Technical College, before joining the RAF during the Second World War as an Aircraft Apprentice in 1942. He was discharged on medical grounds in 1943. He attended Westminster Training College in London from 1946 to 1948, and was a teacher at Foxford School in Coventry from 1948 to 1950.

From 1950 to 1954, Davies was at St Salvator's College, part of the University of St Andrews, from which he received a first class honours degree in Physics. He also won the Neil Arnott Prize and was a Carnegie Scholar. Davies then studied at St John's College, Cambridge. He gained a PhD from Cambridge in 1959, the same year he became a Member of the Institute of Physics. He did research in superconductivity at the Royal Society's Mond Laboratory in Cambridge and was an American Enterprise Institute Research Scientist from 1957 to 1963. That year, he became a lecturer in Physics at the University of Manchester's Faculty of Technology, a role he held until 1966.

== Political career ==
Davies became a councillor on the Borough of Stretford in 1961, where he stayed until 1967. In 1962, he became a Justice of the Peace (JP) in Lancashire. At the 1966 general election, Davies was elected as Labour's Member of Parliament for Stretford. He was Parliamentary Private Secretary to the Postmaster General from November to December 1967, to the Foreign Secretary from January to March 1968 and to the Foreign and Commonwealth Secretary from 1968 to 1969.

He was joint Parliamentary Secretary at the Ministry of Technology from 1969 to 1970, and also Co-Vice-Chairman of the Parliamentary Labour Party's Defence and Services Group. Davies was a member of the Select Committee on Science and Technology from 1966 to 1967, 1967 to 1968 and 1968 to 1969. He was also part of the Parliamentary Delegation to the 24th General Assembly of the United Nations (a UK Representative on the 4th Committee).

He lost his seat at the 1970 general election, which saw the Conservatives return to government; his successor was Winston Churchill, grandson of the former Prime Minister.

== After Parliament ==
In 1972, Davies became a JP for Inner London. He was elected as a member of the London Borough of Southwark in 1974, representing Alleyn ward in Dulwich. For the 1978 elections, he moved to Dulwich's Lyndhurst ward, in the same borough. He remained a councillor until 1982. From 1970 to 1981, Davies was a Management Selection Consultant at MSL. Davies lectured in Business Studies at the Hammersmith and West London College from 1981 until 1987, the year in which he retired. He was made a Chartered Physicist in 1986.

Davies also made contributions to the Proceedings of the Royal Society and the Journal of Physics and Chemistry of Solids.

== Personal life and death ==
Davies was married twice. In 1956, he wed Margaret Stephen Tait Gatt; the marriage was dissolved in 1967. His second marriage, in 1972, was to Patricia Bates; the marriage was dissolved in 1980. He had no children from either of his marriages. In Who's Who, his recreations were listed as "reading, art and design practice, writing family history". He lived in his hometown of Nuneaton.

Davies died in March 2020, aged 93.

Parliament of the United Kingdom
Preceded by Sir Samuel Storey	Member of Parliament for Stretford; 1966 – 1970	Succeeded by Winston Churchill
