= 1962 Southwark Borough Council election =

Election results

Elections to the Metropolitan Borough of Southwark were held in 1962. These were the last elections before the borough became part of the London Borough of Southwark in 1965.

The borough had ten wards which returned between 3 and 8 members. Labour won all the seats and no other party stood a full set of candidates.

== Election result ==
Southwark Borough Election Result 1962
Party	Seats	Gains	Losses	Net gain/loss	Seats %	Votes %	Votes	+/−
Labour	60				100.0			
Conservative	0				0.0			
Liberal	0				0.0			

Preceded by 1959 Southwark Borough election	Southwark local elections	Succeeded by 1964 Southwark Council election
