= 1959 Southwark Borough Council election =

Local election in England

Elections to the Metropolitan Borough of Southwark were held in 1959.

The borough had ten wards which returned between 3 and 8 members. Labour won all the seats and no other party stood a full set of candidates.

== Election result ==
Southwark Borough Election Result 1959
| Party | Seats | Gains | Losses | Net gain/loss | Seats % | Votes % | Votes | +/− |
|---|---|---|---|---|---|---|---|---|
| Labour | 60 | | | | 100.0 | | | |
| Conservative | 0 | | | | 0.0 | | | |
| Liberal | 0 | | | | 0.0 | | | |

| Preceded by 1956 Southwark Borough election | Southwark local elections | Succeeded by 1962 Southwark Borough election |
