= 1945 Southwark Borough Council election =

Local election in England

Elections to the Metropolitan Borough of Southwark were held in 1945.

The borough had ten wards which returned between 3 and 8 members. Labour won all the seats.

== Election result ==
Southwark Borough Election Result 1945
| Party | Seats | Gains | Losses | Net gain/loss | Seats % | Votes % | Votes | +/− |
|---|---|---|---|---|---|---|---|---|
| Labour | 60 | 0 | 0 | 0 | 100.0 | | | |
| Municipal Reform | 0 | 0 | 0 | 0 | 0.0 | | | |
| Communist | 0 | 0 | 0 | 0 | 0.0 | | | |

| Preceded by 1937 Southwark Borough election | Southwark local elections | Succeeded by 1949 Southwark Borough election |
