= 1949 Southwark Borough Council election =

Local election in London

Elections to the Metropolitan Borough of Southwark were held in 1949.

The borough had ten wards which returned between 3 and 8 members. Labour won all the seats.

== Election result ==
Southwark Borough Election Result 1949
Party	Seats	Gains	Losses	Net gain/loss	Seats %	Votes %	Votes	+/−
Labour	60	0	0	0	100.0			
Conservative	0	0	0	0	0.0			
Liberal	0	0	0	0	0.0			

Preceded by 1945 Southwark Borough election	Southwark local elections	Succeeded by 1953 Southwark Borough election
