= 1956 London local elections =

Local elections in England

- 10 May 1956

All 1,356 councillors in all 28 metropolitan boroughs
	First party	Second party
Party	Labour	Conservative
Councils	20	8
Councils +/–	▲1	▼1
Councillors	912	432
Councillors +/–	▲36	▼38

Local elections were held in London on 10 May 1956.

== Electoral arrangements ==
The County of London, outside of the City of London, was divided into 28 metropolitan boroughs. Each borough was divided into a number of multi-member electoral wards.

Councillors were elected to serve a three year term, to go out of office in 1959.

== Results ==
Lewisham was the only council to change control, from Conservative to Labour.

The results for each borough were as follows:

Borough	Previous control	New control	Labour	Conservative	Communist	Independent	Total	Details
Battersea	Labour	Labour	37	18			55	
Bermondsey	Labour	Labour	45				45	Details
Bethnal Green	Labour	Labour	30				30	
Camberwell	Labour	Labour	48	12			60	
Chelsea	Conservative	Conservative	30	6			36	
Deptford	Labour	Labour	33	3			36	
Finsbury	Labour	Labour	32	2			34	
Fulham	Labour	Labour	30	10			40	
Greenwich	Labour	Labour	29	6			35	
Hackney	Labour	Labour	48				48	
Hammersmith	Labour	Labour	33	6			39	
Hampstead	Conservative	Conservative	6	36			42	
Holborn	Conservative	Conservative	3	39			42	
Islington	Labour	Labour	60				60	
Kensington	Conservative	Conservative	18	42			60	
Lambeth	Labour	Labour	45	15			60	
Lewisham	Conservative	Labour	30	25			55	
Paddington	Conservative	Conservative	23	37			60	
Poplar	Labour	Labour	42				42	
Shoreditch	Labour	Labour	33				33	
Southwark	Labour	Labour	60				60	Details
Stepney	Labour	Labour	48		4	8	60	
St Marylebone	Conservative	Conservative	10	50			60	
Stoke Newington	Labour	Labour	27	3			30	
St Pancras	Labour	Labour	37	23			60	
Wandsworth	Conservative	Conservative	28	32			60	
Westminster	Conservative	Conservative		60			60	
Woolwich	Labour	Labour	47	7			54	
Total			912	432	4	8	1,356	
