= 1937 Southwark Borough Council election =

Local election in England

Elections to the Metropolitan Borough of Southwark were held in 1937. This was the last set of elections before World War II.

The borough had ten wards which returned between 3 and 8 members. Labour won all of the seats.

== Electoral arrangements ==
Councillors were elected for a three-year term, to go out of office in November 1940. However, due to the Second World War, and the provisions of the Local Elections and Register of Electors (Temporary Provisions) Acts 1939–1944 and the Representation of the People Act 1945, the terms of those elected in 1937 were extended to 1945.

== Election result ==
Southwark Borough Election Result 1937
Party	Seats	Gains	Losses	Net gain/loss	Seats %	Votes %	Votes	+/−
Labour	60	0	0	0	100.0			
Municipal Reform	0	0	0	0	0.0			
Communist	0	0	0	0	0.0			

Preceded by 1934 Southwark Borough election	Southwark local elections	Succeeded by 1945 Southwark Borough election
