= 1982 Southwark London Borough Council election =

1982 Southwark Council election
- 6 May 1982

All 64 council seats
	First party	Second party	Third party
Party	Labour	Conservative	Independent Labour
Seats won	53	8	3
Seat change	▼3	Steady	▲3
Popular vote	23,138	15,126	1,043
Percentage	42.75%	27.95%	1.93%
Swing	▼15.13	▼8.18	New
Council Control before election
Labour
Council Control
Labour

Elections to Southwark Council were held in May 1982. The whole council was up for election. Turnout was 30.5%.

== Election result ==

Southwark local election result 1982
Party	Seats	Gains	Losses	Net gain/loss	Seats %	Votes %	Votes	+/−
Labour	53	0	3	▼3	85.5	42.75	23,138	▼15.13
Conservative	8	0	0	Steady	12.9	27.95	15,126	▼8.18
Alliance	0	0	0	Steady	0	24.34	13,174	▲20.53
Independent Labour	3	3	0	▲3	1.6	1.93	1,043	New
Ind. Social Democrat	0	0	0	Steady	0	1.25	679	New
Communist	0	0	0	Steady	0	0.75	404	▼0.03
Independent	0	0	0	Steady	0	0.47	254	New
National Front	0	0	0	Steady	0	0.44	239	▼0.86
Workers Revolutionary	0	0	0	Steady	0	0.13	69	▲0.03

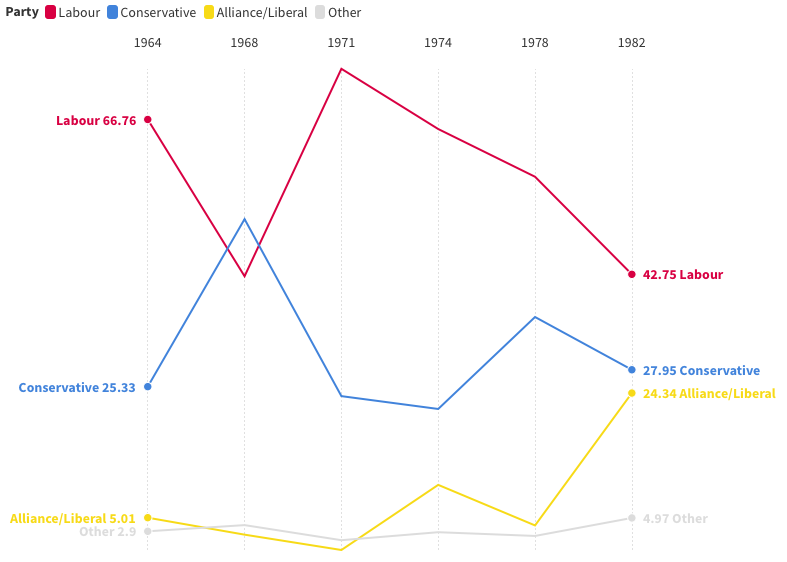
Southwark Council voting history

== Ward results ==
=== Abbey ===
Abbey (2)
Party	Candidate	Votes	%	±%
Labour	John Johnson	775	51.3	−19.5
Labour	Christine McKie	677	44.8	−22.7
Alliance (Liberal)	Patricia Wright	369	24.4	N/A
Alliance (SDP)	James Hughes	355	23.5	N/A
Conservative	Mark Eaton	271	17.9	−4.9
Conservative	Peter Martin	231	15.3	−4.7
Turnout		1,512	30.4	+1.2
Labour hold		Swing		
Labour hold		Swing		

=== Alleyn ===
Alleyn (2)
Party	Candidate	Votes	%	±%
Labour	Elsie Headley	802	35.7	−5.7
Conservative	Pamela Cooper**	783	34.9	−4.7
Labour	Derrick Robinson	773	34.4	+0.5
Conservative	Andrew Rowe	755	33.6	−3.7
Alliance (Liberal)	Jean Halden	505	22.5	+8.6
Alliance (Liberal)	Robert Blackwell	503	22.4	+9.2
Turnout		2,245	39.4	+1.7
Labour hold		Swing		
Conservative hold		Swing		

Pamela Cooper was a sitting councillor for Ruskin ward

=== Barset ===
Barset (2)
Party	Candidate	Votes	%	±%
Labour	Peter Cather*	877	48.3	−6.7
Labour	Nicholas Snow	864	47.6	−8.6
Alliance (Liberal)	Roy Nightingale	556	30.6	+25.0
Alliance (Liberal)	Mark Allen	520	28.6	+23.3
Conservative	Paul Roberts	281	15.5	−14.1
Conservative	Robert Percival	279	15.4	−12.8
Turnout		1,817	35.9	+8.3
Labour hold		Swing		
Labour hold		Swing		

=== Bellenden ===
Bellenden (3)
Party	Candidate	Votes	%	±%
Labour	Judith Cliffe	1,346	40.4	−6.6
Labour	Samuel King	1,291	38.8	−3.0
Labour	Ann Ward*	1,269	38.1	−8.0
Conservative	Gerard Fergus	1,067	32.0	−4.7
Conservative	Peter Forder	1,031	31.0	−3.9
Conservative	Nigel Linacre	1,007	30.2	−4.5
Alliance (Liberal)	Alexander Baker	629	18.9	+11.0
Alliance (SDP)	Iain Johncock	585	17.6	+9.9
Alliance (SDP)	Leroy Phillips	573	17.2	+9.9
Turnout		3,330	38.3	+2.2
Labour hold		Swing		
Labour hold		Swing		
Labour hold		Swing		

=== Bricklayers ===
Bricklayers (2)
Party	Candidate	Votes	%	±%
Labour	John Bryan	776	40.6	−28.5
Labour	Stephen Marsling	731	38.2	−25.3
Alliance (Liberal)	Edwin Langdown	607	31.7	N/A
Alliance (SDP)	Janet Machin	566	29.6	N/A
Conservative	Alan Corps	312	16.3	−9.6
Conservative	Noel Picarda-Kemp	252	13.2	−11.6
Ind. Social Democrat	William Musgrave	198	10.4	N/A
Turnout		1,912	34.0	+5.6
Labour hold		Swing		
Labour hold		Swing		

=== Browning ===
Browning (3)
Party	Candidate	Votes	%	±%
Labour	Graeme Geddes	1,201	53.2	−8.0
Labour	David Fryer	1,170	51.8	−8.9
Labour	Ronald Terrett	1,146	50.8	−8.7
Conservative	Stephen Payne	446	19.8	−8.7
Conservative	Greta Fergus	443	19.6	−7.4
Conservative	Angela Meakin	437	19.4	−5.8
Alliance (Liberal)	Martin Bennett	423	18.7	N/A
Alliance (SDP)	John Damer	403	17.9	N/A
Alliance (Liberal)	Richard Malins	382	16.9	N/A
Turnout		2,257	29.6	+3.9
Labour hold		Swing		
Labour hold		Swing		
Labour hold		Swing		

=== Brunswick ===
Brunswick (3)
Party	Candidate	Votes	%	±%
Labour	John Lauder*	1,005	46.1	−8.5
Labour	Jessie Cannon	929	42.6	−16.5
Labour	Madan Kalia	799	36.7	−7.9
Alliance (Liberal)	Hugh Mooney	531	24.4	N/A
Alliance (SDP)	Michael Hall	499	22.9	N/A
Alliance (SDP)	Robert Shearer	491	22.5	N/A
Conservative	Patricia Bristow	447	20.5	−5.8
Conservative	Douglas Mitchell	438	20.1	−4.5
Conservative	Alfred Shaughnessy	417	19.1	−6.1
Communist	Eric Hodson	83	3.8	N/A
Turnout		2,180	27.1	−1.5
Labour hold		Swing		
Labour hold		Swing		
Labour hold		Swing		

=== Burgess ===
Burgess (2)
Party	Candidate	Votes	%	±%
Labour	Trevor Ely*	657	50.7	−11.0
Labour	Ronald Slater*	623	48.0	−14.0
Conservative	Donald Case	270	20.8	−8.3
Conservative	Clive Jones	260	20.0	−6.7
Alliance (Liberal)	Diana Jenkins	249	19.2	N/A
Alliance (SDP)	David Ramsay	231	17.8	N/A
Turnout		1,297	26.6	+0.3
Labour hold		Swing		
Labour hold		Swing		

=== Cathedral ===
Cathedral (2)
Party	Candidate	Votes	%	±%
Labour	Geoffrey Williams	791	47.5	−22.4
Labour	Alan Davis*	786	47.2	−17.0
Conservative	David Walker	437	26.3	+0.5
Conservative	Michael Sherlock	399	24.0	−0.1
Alliance (SDP)	Bert Ray**	340	20.4	N/A
Alliance (SDP)	George Ruddock	318	19.1	N/A
Turnout		1,664	28.5	+1.3
Labour hold		Swing		
Labour hold		Swing		

Bert Ray was a sitting councillor for Chaucer ward, and was previously elected as a Labour councillor

=== Chaucer ===
Chaucer (3)
Party	Candidate	Votes	%	±%
Labour	John Fowler	1,219	43.2	−18.7
Labour	Anne Matthews	1,106	39.2	−18.6
Labour	Jessica Wanamaker	1,091	38.6	−18.3
Alliance (Liberal)	Rose Colley	800	28.3	N/A
Alliance (SDP)	John Egan	779	27.6	N/A
Alliance (Liberal)	Richard Shearman	740	26.2	N/A
Conservative	James Bourlet	492	17.4	−10.7
Conservative	Beatrice North	469	16.6	−13.4
Conservative	Sarah Keays	465	16.5	−10.3
Independent	Anne Keane	284	10.1	N/A
Independent	John Axon	224	7.9	N/A
Turnout		2,825	35.3	+7.1
Labour hold		Swing		
Labour hold		Swing		
Labour hold		Swing		

=== College ===
College (2)
Party	Candidate	Votes	%	±%
Conservative	Bryan Hoskins*	1,676	53.3	−2.5
Conservative	Margaret Jackson*	1,606	51.1	−1.7
Labour	Peter Bowyer	713	22.7	−13.8
Alliance (SDP)	Angela Simons	673	21.4	+15.1
Alliance (Liberal)	Patricia Mynott	661	21.0	+15.3
Labour	John Rolfs	629	20.0	−13.1
Turnout		3,143	49.7	−1.9
Conservative hold		Swing		
Conservative hold		Swing		

=== Consort ===
Consort (2)
Party	Candidate	Votes	%	±%
Labour	Elizabeth Bendell	828	54.9	−3.7
Labour	Robert Smyth*	819	54.3	−5.6
Conservative	Charles Cooper	275	18.2	−7.8
Conservative	Johanna Holland	268	17.8	−14.1
Alliance (SDP)	William Jones	231	16.9	N/A
Alliance (SDP)	Bridget McKew	214	14.2	N/A
Turnout		1,507	31.1	+0.3
Labour hold		Swing		
Labour hold		Swing		

=== Dockyard ===
Dockyard (3)
Party	Candidate	Votes	%	±%
Labour	John O'Grady*	1,300	59.8	−10.8
Labour	Thomas Sullivan	1,219	56.0	−15.3
Labour	Barry Quirk	1,158	53.2	−16.8
Alliance (SDP)	George Murphy	435	20.0	N/A
Alliance (Liberal)	Sylvia Russell	402	18.5	N/A
Alliance (SDP)	Roy Ashworth	378	17.4	N/A
Conservative	Percy Gray	306	14.1	−4.5
Conservative	Nicholas Van-Dar-Borgh	277	12.7	−2.9
Conservative	Eileen Bascombe	272	12.5	−2.5
Communist	Elizabeth Wright	140	6.4	−1.3
Turnout		2,175	33.4	+4.6
Labour hold		Swing		
Labour hold		Swing		
Labour hold		Swing		

=== Faraday ===
Faraday (3)
Party	Candidate	Votes	%	±%
Labour	James Greening*	1,205	53.7	−9.7
Labour	David Payne	1,117	49.8	−14.5
Labour	Henry Quennell	1,067	47.5	−14.6
Conservative	Jeremy Gaunt	541	24.1	−3.6
Alliance (SDP)	Martin Osborne	509	22.7	N/A
Conservative	Gladys Cobley	465	20.7	−4.5
Conservative	Cyril Piper	389	17.3	−7.1
National Front	Anthony Hussey	111	4.9	N/A
National Front	David Teanby	80	3.6	N/A
Communist	Susan Lewis	57	2.5	N/A
Turnout		2,245	22.3	−0.8
Labour hold		Swing		
Labour hold		Swing		
Labour hold		Swing		

=== Friary ===
Friary (3)
Party	Candidate	Votes	%	±%
Labour	Mabel Goldwin*	892	51.3	−8.1
Labour	David Main	844	48.5	−8.4
Labour	Rupert Doyle	807	46.4	−8.0
Alliance (SDP)	James Clark	360	20.7	N/A
Conservative	Leslie Brown	352	20.2	−4.9
Alliance (SDP)	Paul Eden	344	19.8	N/A
Alliance (SDP)	Mary Hobson	329	18.9	N/A
Conservative	Evannie Smith	309	17.8	−4.4
Conservative	George Noorden	303	17.4	−4.0
Turnout		1,739	28.4	+1.4
Labour hold		Swing		
Labour hold		Swing		
Labour hold		Swing		

=== Liddle ===
Liddle (3)
Party	Candidate	Votes	%	±%
Labour	Daniel McCarthy	985	58.6	−5.9
Labour	John Fowler*	982	58.4	−8.1
Labour	Anne McNaught*	865	51.5	−13.5
Alliance (Liberal)	David Cartwright	265	15.8	N/A
Alliance (SDP)	Doreen Payne	228	13.6	N/A
Conservative	Albert Rumble	228	13.6	−1.9
Alliance (SDP)	Leslie Candappa	204	12.1	N/A
Conservative	Pamela Rumble	204	12.1	+0.1
Conservative	Christopher Rumble	199	11.8	+0.7
Workers Revolutionary	Graham Hobbs	69	4.1	N/A
Turnout		1,681	20.2	−4.9
Labour hold		Swing		
Labour hold		Swing		
Labour hold		Swing		

=== Lyndhurst ===
Lyndhurst (3)
Party	Candidate	Votes	%	±%
Labour	Paula Moore**	1,360	38.0	−9.8
Labour	Aubyn Graham	1,271	35.5	−11.9
Labour	Andrew Troke	1,206	33.7	−13.3
Conservative	Doris Pearce	1,153	31.1	−7.4
Conservative	Ashwinkumar Tanna	1,116	31.1	−4.7
Conservative	Ruth Nicholson	1,063	29.7	−8.2
Alliance (SDP)	William Payne*	856	23.9	−23.9
Alliance (Liberal)	Nicholas Rowden	804	22.4	+15.7
Alliance (SDP)	Jonathan Winter	778	21.7	+15.0
Turnout		3,583	39.4	−0.7
Labour hold		Swing		
Labour hold		Swing		
Labour hold		Swing		

Paula Moore was a sitting councillor for Rye ward

William Payne was previously elected as a Labour councillor

=== Newington ===
Newington (3)
Party	Candidate	Votes	%	±%
Labour	John Wentworth	1,134	44.5	−16.2
Labour	Solomon Parry*	1,080	42.3	−17.1
Labour	Tony Goss	1,060	41.6	−17.4
Conservative	William Goody	486	19.1	−13.4
Alliance (Liberal)	Neville Clemens	475	18.6	N/A
Conservative	Anne-Louise Kearney-Pateman	460	18.0	−11.4
Alliance (Liberal)	Gillian Clemens	452	17.7	N/A
Conservative	Robert Primmer	421	16.5	−12.9
Alliance (SDP)	Jack Roberts	353	13.8	N/A
Ind. Social Democrat	Catherine Clunn*	312	12.2	−46.8
National Front	Mary Bailey	98	3.8	N/A
National Front	Raymond Barker	98	3.8	N/A
National Front	James Sneath	88	3.4	N/A
Turnout		2,551	32.3	+4.4
Labour hold		Swing		
Labour hold		Swing		
Labour hold		Swing		

Catherine Clunn was previously elected as a Labour councillor

=== Riverside ===
Riverside (3)
Party	Candidate	Votes	%	±%
Independent Labour	Coral Newell*	1,157	41.3	−24.4
Independent Labour	Barbara Burgess	1,016	36.3	N/A
Independent Labour	James Patrick	956	34.1	N/A
Alliance (Liberal)	Simon Hughes	636	22.7	N/A
Alliance (Liberal)	Ronald Tindall	634	22.6	N/A
Labour	Elizabeth Crickmar	623	22.3	−49.1
Labour	Sidney Howard	606	21.6	−47.7
Alliance (Liberal)	Janet McCloud	594	21.2	N/A
Labour	Richard Dawson	589	21.0	−44.7
Conservative	Norman Bascombe	264	9.4	−11.0
Conservative	Mary Corps	257	9.2	−11.0
Conservative	Reginald Evans	244	8.7	−8.5
Ind. Social Democrat	Charles Sawyer**	176	6.3	N/A
Ind. Social Democrat	Margaret White*	162	5.8	−62.4
Turnout		2,800	45.0	+8.9
Independent Labour gain from Labour		Swing		
Independent Labour gain from Labour		Swing		
Independent Labour gain from Labour		Swing		

Coral Newell was previously elected as a Labour councillor

Charles Sawyer was a sitting councillor for Rotherhithe ward, and was previously elected as a Labour councillor

Margaret White was previously elected as a Labour councillor

=== Rotherhithe ===
Rotherhithe (3)
Party	Candidate	Votes	%	±%
Labour	Harold Young*	909	46.6	−21.3
Labour	David Brasier	887	45.5	−24.9
Labour	Alexander Coveney	872	44.7	−24.2
Alliance (Liberal)	Carol Sawyer	521	26.7	N/A
Alliance (Liberal)	Thomas Taylor	521	26.7	N/A
Alliance (SDP)	Raymond Dutton	448	23.0	N/A
Conservative	David Bellamy	336	17.2	−4.6
Conservative	Michael Pike	301	15.4	−3.1
Conservative	Alison Pike	292	15.0	−3.3
Communist	Robert Gordon	50	2.6	N/A
Turnout		1,949	30.3	+5.6
Labour hold		Swing		
Labour hold		Swing		
Labour hold		Swing		

=== Ruskin ===
Ruskin (3)
Party	Candidate	Votes	%	±%
Conservative	John Meakin*	2,186	50.5	−12.0
Conservative	Catherine Clough**	2,170	50.1	−12.3
Conservative	Tobias Eckersley*	2,152	49.7	−12.6
Alliance (SDP)	Brian Bishop	1,268	29.3	+20.4
Alliance (Liberal)	Anthony Plumb	1,248	28.8	+20.1
Alliance (SDP)	Jonathan Mitchell	1,239	28.6	+20.1
Labour	David Jones	638	14.7	−10.2
Labour	Dora Hayling	634	14.6	−8.0
Labour	Michael Idun	626	14.5	−7.9
Turnout		4,328	52.5	+5.9
Conservative hold		Swing		
Conservative hold		Swing		
Conservative hold		Swing		

Catherine Clough was a sitting councillor for Alleyn ward

=== Rye ===
Rye (2)
Party	Candidate	Votes	%	±%
Conservative	Richard Clough	1,320	43.0	−6.2
Conservative	Ralph Spilberg*	1,267	41.2	−5.9
Labour	Peter Bibby	933	30.4	−7.3
Labour	Geoffrey Cravitz	862	28.1	−9.3
Alliance (Liberal)	James Murrell	684	22.3	+16.2
Alliance (SDP)	Robert Skelly	681	22.2	+16.3
Turnout		3,072	44.5	+1.0
Conservative hold		Swing		
Conservative hold		Swing		

=== St Giles ===
St Giles (3)
Party	Candidate	Votes	%	±%
Labour	Leslie Alden*	1,391	50.3	−6.9
Labour	Anthony Ritchie**	1,272	46.0	−11.7
Labour	Michael Geater**	1,266	45.8	−11.1
Alliance (Liberal)	John Bennett	749	27.1	+21.6
Alliance (Liberal)	Veronica Hunt	602	21.8	+16.8
Alliance (SDP)	Leaford Patrick	543	19.7	+14.8
Conservative	John Hoskinson	489	17.7	−12.7
Conservative	Frederick Smith	472	17.1	−10.0
Conservative	John Villiers	470	17.0	−9.9
Turnout		2,763	31.3	+2.3
Labour hold		Swing		
Labour hold		Swing		
Labour hold		Swing		

Anthony Ritchie was a sitting councillor for Barset ward

Michael Geater was a sitting councillor for Liddle ward

=== The Lane ===
The Lane (2)
Party	Candidate	Votes	%	±%
Labour	Susan Goss	861	40.7	−16.9
Labour	Alexander Macpherson	797	37.6	−14.4
Alliance (SDP)	John Lewis*	620	29.3	+23.9
Alliance (Liberal)	Jonathan Hunt	584	27.6	+23.1
Conservative	Douglas Pearce	431	20.4	−4.8
Conservative	Ian Twinn	427	20.2	−3.3
National Front	Gary Dunkin	53	2.5	−6.8
National Front	Peter Core	43	2.0	N/A
Turnout		2,117	35.5	+2.9
Labour hold		Swing		
Labour hold		Swing		

=== Waverley ===
Waverley (2)
Party	Candidate	Votes	%	±%
Labour	Brian Kelly	914	40.3	−5.6
Labour	Helen Penn	821	36.2	−9.7
Conservative	Anthony Paterson	819	36.1	−4.4
Conservative	Florence Tristram	740	32.6	−7.4
Alliance (SDP)	Frank Brean**	431	19.0	+13.5
Alliance (Liberal)	David Barrett	427	18.8	+13.3
Communist	Walter Macfarlane	74	3.3	N/A
Turnout		2,268	39.1	−2.0
Labour hold		Swing		
Labour hold		Swing		

== By-Elections ==
Riverside by-election, 10 March 1983
Party	Candidate	Votes	%	±%
Alliance (Liberal)	Ronald Tindall	1,584	56.6	+34.0
Independent Labour	Edward Hart	780	27.8	−6.3
Labour	Michael Idun	233	8.3	−14.0
New Britain	Kevin Mason	118	4.2	N/A
Conservative	Michael Pike	77	2.7	−6.7
Communist	Robert Gordon	9	0.3	N/A
Turnout			43.6	−1.4
Alliance gain from Independent Labour		Swing		

The by-election was called following the resignation of Cllr. James Patrick

Consort by-election, 8 March 1983
Party	Candidate	Votes	%	±%
Labour	Peter Troy	691	44.7	−9.6
Alliance (Liberal)	Richard Shearman	438	28.3	+11.4
Conservative	Anthony Patterson	339	21.9	+3.7
National Front	Mary Bailey	77	5.0	N/A
Turnout			31.1	±0.0
Labour hold		Swing		

The by-election was called following the resignation of Cllr. Robert Smyth

Burgess by-election, 23 February 1984
Party	Candidate	Votes	%	±%
Alliance (Liberal)	Rose Colley	840	53.7	+34.5
Labour	Kevin Joiner	596	38.1	−9.9
Conservative	Beatrice North	81	5.2	−15.6
National Front	Peter Core	47	3.0	N/A
Turnout			34.5	−7.9
Alliance gain from Labour		Swing		

The by-election was called following the resignation of Cllr. Ronald Slater

Ruskin by-election, 23 February 1984
Party	Candidate	Votes	%	±%
Conservative	Peter Forder	1,714	50.1	−0.4
Labour	Peter Russell	832	24.3	+9.6
Alliance (SDP)	Jonathan Mitchell	791	23.1	−5.5
National Front	Raymond Barker	83	2.4	N/A
Turnout			42.9	−9.6
Conservative hold		Swing		

The by-election was called following the resignation of Cllr. John Meakin

Lyndhurst by-election, 12 July 1984
Party	Candidate	Votes	%	±%
Labour	Alan Crane	1,423	53.4	+15.4
Conservative	Barry Hallett	656	24.6	−6.5
Alliance (SDP)	Robert Skelly	519	19.5	−4.4
National Front	Raymond Barker	65	2.4	N/A
Turnout			28.9	−10.5
Labour hold		Swing		

The by-election was called following the resignation of Cllr. Paula Moore

Rotherhithe by-election, 13 September 1984
Party	Candidate	Votes	%	±%
Alliance (Liberal)	Frank Pemberton	1,381	60.9	+34.2
Labour	Trevor Lawrence	780	34.4	−12.2
Conservative	Percy Gray	55	2.4	−14.8
National Front	Peter Core	50	2.2	N/A
Turnout			35.2	+4.9
Alliance gain from Labour		Swing		

The by-election was called following the resignation of Cllr. Harold Young

Riverside by-election, 15 August 1985
Party	Candidate	Votes	%	±%
Alliance (Liberal)	Michael Hannon	1,656	65.2	+42.5
Labour	John Thomas	801	31.6	+9.3
Conservative	Beatrice North	81	3.2	−6.2
Turnout			38.6	−6.4
Alliance gain from Independent Labour		Swing		

The by-election was called following the resignation of Cllr. Barbara Burgess

Liddle by-election, 19 December 1985
Party	Candidate	Votes	%	±%
Labour	Mary Ellery	1,032	81.7	+23.3
Alliance (SDP)	Doreen Payne	164	13.0	−0.6
Conservative	Trevor Pitman	67	5.3	−8.3
Turnout			15.5	−4.7
Labour hold		Swing		

The by-election was called following the resignation of Cllr. John Fowler
