= 1971 Southwark London Borough Council election =

1971 Southwark Council election
- 13 May 1971

All council seats
	First party	Second party
Party	Labour	Conservative
Seats won	68	2
Seat change	▲25	▼25
Popular vote	44,720	14,301
Percentage	74.62%	23.86%
Swing	▲32.17%	▼27.45%
Council Control before election
Labour
Council Control
Labour

Elections to Southwark Council were held in May 1971. The whole council was up for election. Turnout was 28.7%.

This election had aldermen as well as councillors. Labour got all ten aldermen as well as 58 elected councillors. The Liberal Party did not contest any seats.

== Election result ==

Southwark local election result 1971
Party	Seats	Gains	Losses	Net gain/loss	Seats %	Votes %	Votes	+/−
Labour	68			▲25	97.14	74.62	44,720	▲32.17
Conservative	2			▼25	2.86	23.86	14,301	▼27.45
Communist	0			Steady	0.00	1.31	787	▼2.55
National Front	0			Steady	0.00	0.21	126	New

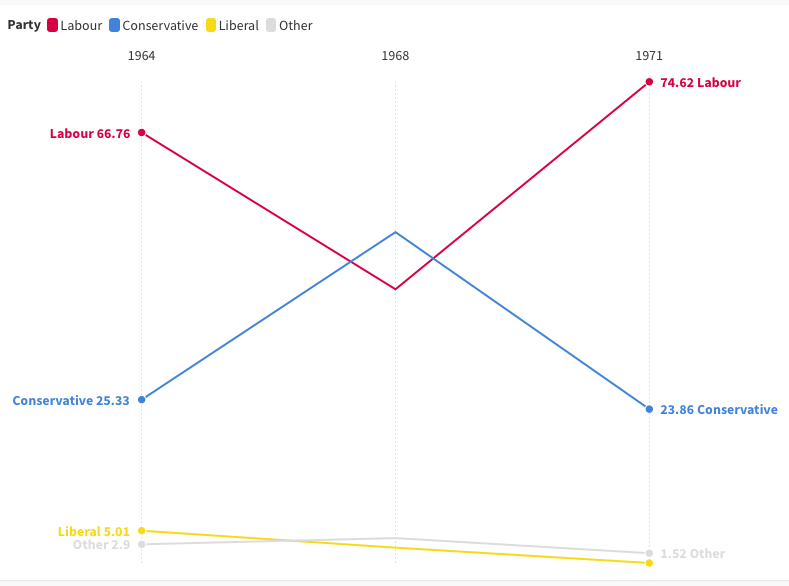
Southwark Council voting history

== Ward results ==
=== Abbey ===
Abbey (2)
Party	Candidate	Votes	%	±%
Labour	C.J. Coveney	2,092	86.0	
Labour	J. Dower	2,086	85.8	
Conservative	P. Gray	266	10.9	
Turnout		2,432	34.8	
Labour win (new seat)				
Labour win (new seat)				

=== Alleyn ===
Alleyn (2)
Party	Candidate	Votes	%	±%
Labour	Mrs E. Headley	1,521	63.3	
Labour	Mrs A.S. Ward	1,468	61.1	
Conservative	H.J. Partridge	842	35.0	
Conservative	R.C. Gent	827	34.4	
Turnout		2,403	36.6	
Labour win (new seat)				
Labour win (new seat)				

=== Bellenden ===
Bellenden (3)
Party	Candidate	Votes	%	±%
Labour	S.H. Catt	2,037	60.5	
Labour	F.E. Lee	2,025	60.2	
Labour	Miss M.A. Cork	1,964	58.4	
Conservative	B.C. Leach	1,169	34.7	
Conservative	D.M. Lang	1,122	33.3	
Conservative	A.G. Sinclair	1,121	33.3	
Communist	E.L. Hodson	159	4.7	
Turnout		3,365	34.0	
Labour win (new seat)				
Labour win (new seat)				
Labour win (new seat)				

=== Bricklayers ===
Bricklayers (2)
Party	Candidate	Votes	%	±%
Labour	L.A.J. Henley	1,101	62.2	
Labour	Mrs F. Whitnall	1,060	59.9	
Conservative	C.C. Hayward	460	26.0	
Conservative	F.H. Morgan	459	25.9	
Communist	R. Gordon	41	2.3	
Turnout		1,769	28.1	
Labour win (new seat)				
Labour win (new seat)				

=== Browning ===
Browning (3)
Party	Candidate	Votes	%	±%
Labour	S.R. Combes	1,837	83.2	
Labour	Rev J.W. Watson	1,808	81.9	
Labour	J.S. Lees	1,800	81.5	
Conservative	J. Gordon	268	12.1	
Conservative	Miss H.B. Petrie	243	11.0	
Conservative	A.I. Robin	240	10.9	
Communist	M.J. Chislett	92	4.2	
Turnout		2,208	27.0	
Labour win (new seat)				
Labour win (new seat)				
Labour win (new seat)				

=== Brunswick ===
Brunswick (3)
Party	Candidate	Votes	%	±%
Labour	E.W.T. Pruce	2,080	82.7	
Labour	Miss A.G. Liddle	2,067	82.2	
Labour	R.Watts	2,054	81.7	
Conservative	Mrs K. Howley	304	12.1	
Conservative	Mrs J. Holland	299	11.9	
Communist	Mrs J. Willoughby	144	5.7	
Turnout		2,515	27.9	
Labour win (new seat)				
Labour win (new seat)				
Labour win (new seat)				

=== Burgess ===
Burgess (3)
Party	Candidate	Votes	%	±%
Labour	Mrs J.E. Cannon	1,725	84.1	
Labour	J.H.K. Fowler	1,708	83.3	
Labour	Mrs E.S. Daymond	1,696	82.7	
Conservative	Mrs G. Cobley	221	10.8	
Communist	J.T. Ruddell	155	7.6	
Turnout		2,051	25.1	
Labour win (new seat)				
Labour win (new seat)				
Labour win (new seat)				

=== Cathedral ===
Cathedral (3)
Party	Candidate	Votes	%	±%
Labour	C.C. Gates	1,595	85.6	
Labour	D.D. McCoid	1,547	83.0	
Labour	E.J. Hall	1,496	80.3	
Conservative	Mrs E.R. Hale	311	16.7	
Conservative	F.N. Richardson	207	11.1	
Conservative	R.S. Higgins	204	11.0	
Turnout		1,863	19.0	
Labour win (new seat)				
Labour win (new seat)				
Labour win (new seat)				

=== Chaucer ===
Chaucer (3)
Party	Candidate	Votes	%	±%
Labour	A.E. Knight	2,051	80.0	
Labour	Mrs M.G. Farrow	2,039	79.5	
Labour	N.H. Tertis	1,993	77.7	
Conservative	Miss B.E. North	452	17.6	
Conservative	C.V. Brewster	442	17.2	
Conservative	Miss D.N. Parsons	442	17.2	
Turnout		2,565	29.7	
Labour win (new seat)				
Labour win (new seat)				
Labour win (new seat)				

=== College ===
College (2)
Party	Candidate	Votes	%	±%
Labour	Mrs E.A. Ackroyd	2,008	50.9	
Labour	W.G. Symes	1,970	49.9	
Conservative	R.W. Ames	1,925	48.8	
Conservative	I.M. Andrews	1,873	47.4	
Turnout		3,948	46.8	
Labour win (new seat)				
Labour win (new seat)				

=== Consort ===
Consort (2)
Party	Candidate	Votes	%	±%
Labour	W.F. Jones	1,322	86.8	
Labour	R.A. Cheesewright	1,272	83.5	
Conservative	R.J. Percival	179	11.8	
Conservative	Mrs M.A. Vaughan	165	10.8	
Turnout		1,523	27.0	
Labour win (new seat)				
Labour win (new seat)				

=== Dockyard ===
Dockyard (2)
Party	Candidate	Votes	%	±%
Labour	Mrs L.M. Brown	2,471	89.9	
Labour	John H. O'Grady	2,414	87.8	
Conservative	Mrs W.I. Hopgood	233	8.5	
Conservative	G.W. Hargest	227	8.3	
Turnout		2,748	35.0	
Labour win (new seat)				
Labour win (new seat)				

=== Faraday ===
Faraday (4)
Party	Candidate	Votes	%	±%
Labour	F.W. Combes	2,751	85.2	
Labour	R.M. Slater	2,727	84.5	
Labour	C.A. Farrow	2,717	84.1	
Labour	Mrs A.E. Waller	2,670	82.7	
Conservative	Mrs K. Field	305	9.4	
Conservative	S.H. Smith	296	9.2	
Conservative	G.R. Baxter	284	8.8	
Conservative	Mrs K.J. Watts	275	8.5	
Communist	D.F. Marks	196	6.1	
Turnout		3,229	26.9	
Labour win (new seat)				
Labour win (new seat)				
Labour win (new seat)				
Labour win (new seat)				

=== Friary ===
Friary (3)
Party	Candidate	Votes	%	±%
Labour	Mrs M.V. Goldwin	2,003	88.2	
Labour	C.A.W. Hogben	1,979	87.1	
Labour	F.A. Goldwin	1,975	86.9	
Conservative	E.L. Keetch	199	8.8	
Conservative	Mrs C.E. Pitman	180	7.9	
Conservative	Mrs F.I. Tristram	169	7.4	
Turnout		2,272	25.8	
Labour win (new seat)				
Labour win (new seat)				
Labour win (new seat)				

=== Lyndhurst ===
Lyndhurst (3)
Party	Candidate	Votes	%	±%
Labour	W.H. Payne	3,012	69.5	
Labour	H.C. Potter	2,990	69.0	
Labour	D.J. Whiting	2,900	67.0	
Conservative	Mrs P.C. Cooper	1,237	28.6	
Conservative	T.J. Smith	1,221	28.2	
Conservative	R. Spilberg	1,181	27.3	
Turnout		4,331	39.2	
Labour win (new seat)				
Labour win (new seat)				
Labour win (new seat)				

=== Newington ===
Newington (3)
Party	Candidate	Votes	%	±%
Labour	C.A.G. Halford	2,100	80.2	
Labour	J.J. Lauder	2,066	78.9	
Labour	Mrs C.M. Clunn	2,045	78.1	
Conservative	E. Greenwood	432	16.5	
Conservative	Mrs J.M. Greenwood	417	15.9	
Conservative	J.A. Villers	403	15.4	
Turnout		2,618	25.7	
Labour win (new seat)				
Labour win (new seat)				
Labour win (new seat)				

=== Riverside ===
Riverside (2)
Party	Candidate	Votes	%	±%
Labour	Mrs A. Stevens	2,250	84.6	
Labour	L.T. Tucker	2,244	84.4	
Conservative	A.J. Padmore	352	13.2	
Turnout		2,659	34.7	
Labour win (new seat)				
Labour win (new seat)				

=== Rotherhithe ===
Rotherhithe (2)
Party	Candidate	Votes	%	±%
Labour	E.A. Rowe	1,843	90.2	
Labour	H.W.G. Young	1,750	85.7	
Conservative	B.D. Thurnell	189	9.3	
Turnout		2,043	28.5	
Labour win (new seat)				
Labour win (new seat)				

=== Ruskin ===
Ruskin (2)
Party	Candidate	Votes	%	±%
Conservative	Mrs H.E. Day	1,928	60.8	
Conservative	H.J. Grant	1,914	60.3	
Labour	R.J.G. Keene	1,225	38.6	
Labour	S. Robinson	1,178	37.1	
Turnout		3,173	42.4	
Conservative win (new seat)				
Conservative win (new seat)				

=== Rye ===
Rye (2)
Party	Candidate	Votes	%	±%
Labour	Miss A. Brereton	1,430	50.2	
Labour	T. Herron	1,427	50.1	
Conservative	W.V. Fuller	1,377	48.4	
Conservative	A.P. Pritchett	1,334	46.9	
Turnout		2,846	39.5	
Labour win (new seat)				
Labour win (new seat)				

=== St Giles ===
St Giles (3)
Party	Candidate	Votes	%	±%
Labour	L.H. Alden	1,973	77.1	
Labour	Mrs E.M. Dalton	1,973	77.1	
Labour	R. Wedlake	1,898	74.2	
Conservative	J.D. Kilbane	403	15.7	
Conservative	M.P. Mulligan	353	13.8	
Conservative	G. Scott	315	12.3	
National Front	Mrs C.M. Pirie	132	5.2	
National Front	P.C. Williams	128	5.0	
National Front	Mrs J.P. Pirie	117	4.6	
Turnout		2,559	24.0	
Labour win (new seat)				
Labour win (new seat)				
Labour win (new seat)				

=== The Lane ===
The Lane (3)
Party	Candidate	Votes	%	±%
Labour	F.J. Brean	3,166	75.5	
Labour	G. Byfield	3,102	74.0	
Labour	P. Cather	3,068	73.2	
Labour	F.T. Rolfe	2,964	70.7	
Conservative	Mrs J.R. Bryant	1,172	28.0	
Conservative	Mrs L.C. Marshall	824	19.7	
Conservative	R.P. Primmer	792	18.9	
Conservative	A.E. Smith	790	18.8	
Turnout		4,192	29.9	
Labour win (new seat)				
Labour win (new seat)				
Labour win (new seat)				
Labour win (new seat)				

=== Waverley ===
Waverley (2)
Party	Candidate	Votes	%	±%
Labour	H.T. Ball	1,730	70.9	
Labour	C. Rouse	1,698	69.6	
Conservative	Miss B.C. Rayson	687	28.2	
Conservative	F.J. Shirley	653	26.8	
Turnout		2,439	37.6	
Labour win (new seat)				
Labour win (new seat)				
