= Southwark London Borough Council elections =

English local authority elections

Southwark London Borough Council is the local authority for the London Borough of Southwark in London, England. The council is elected every four years. Since the last boundary changes in 2018, 63 councillors have been elected from 23 wards.

== Political control ==
The first election to the council was held in 1964, initially operating as a shadow authority before the new system came into full effect in 1965. Political control of the council since 1964 has been held by the following parties:

Election	Overall Control	Labour	Lib Dem	Conservative	Green	Ind.
1964	Labour	64	-	6	-	-
1968	Labour	43	-	27	-	-
1971	Labour	68	-	2	-	-
1974	Labour	66	-	4	-	-
1978	Labour	56	-	8	-	-
1982	Labour	53	-	8	-	3
1986	Labour	43	15	6	-	-
1990	Labour	37	21	6	-	-
1994	Labour	34	27	3	-	-
1998	Labour	33	27	4	-	-
2002	No overall control	28	30	5	-	-
2006	No overall control	28	28	6	1	-
2010	Labour	35	25	3	-	-
2014	Labour	48	13	2	-	-
2018	Labour	49	14	-	-	-
2022	Labour	52	11	-	-	-
2026	No overall control	29	12	-	22	-

== Council elections ==
- 1964 Southwark London Borough Council election
- 1968 Southwark London Borough Council election (boundary changes increased the number of seats by one)
- 1971 Southwark London Borough Council election
- 1974 Southwark London Borough Council election
- 1978 Southwark London Borough Council election (boundary changes increased the number of seats by four)
- 1982 Southwark London Borough Council election
- 1986 Southwark London Borough Council election
- 1990 Southwark London Borough Council election
- 1994 Southwark London Borough Council election (boundary changes took place but the number of seats remained the same) (Note: The Bromley, Croydon, Lambeth, Lewisham and Southwark (London Borough Boundaries) Order 1993) (Note: The Croydon, Lambeth and Southwark (London Borough Boundaries) Order 1993) (Note: The Lewisham and Southwark (London Borough Boundaries) Order 1993)
- 1998 Southwark London Borough Council election
- 2002 Southwark London Borough Council election (boundary changes reduced the number of seats by one)
- 2006 Southwark London Borough Council election
- 2010 Southwark London Borough Council election
- 2014 Southwark London Borough Council election
- 2018 Southwark London Borough Council election (boundary changes took place but the number of seats remained the same)
- 2022 Southwark London Borough Council election
- 2026 Southwark London Borough Council election

== Borough result maps ==
2002 results map

2006 results map

2010 results map

2014 results map

2018 results map

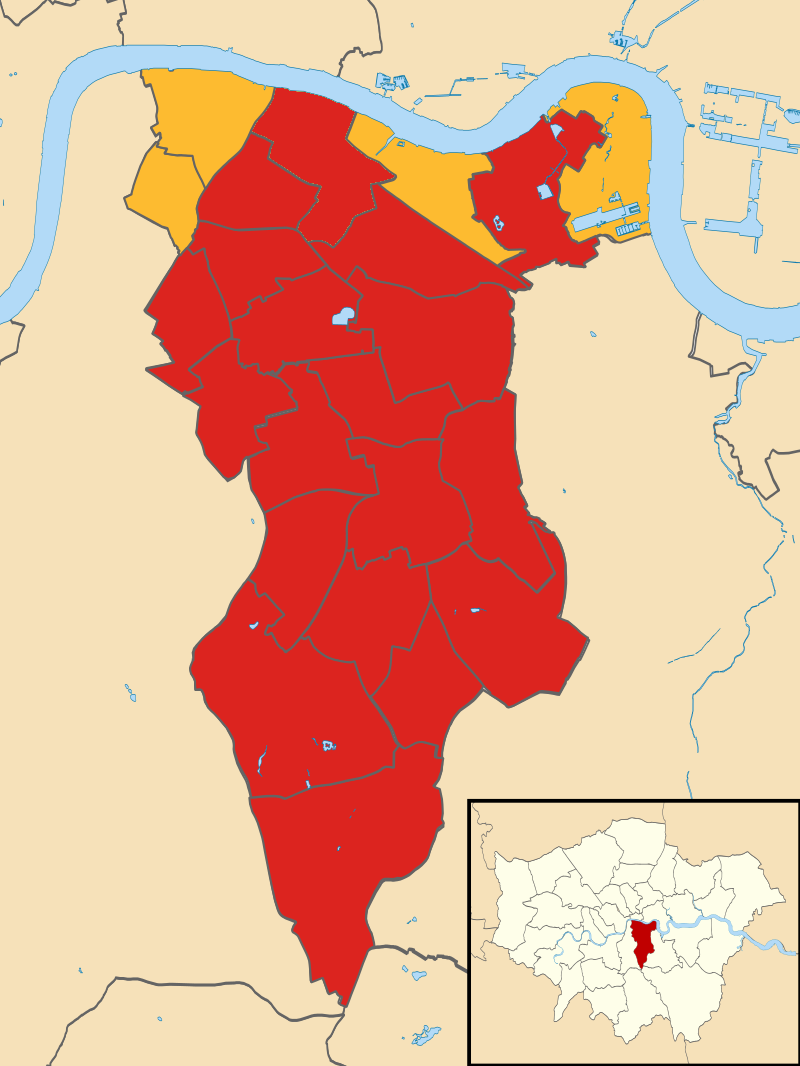
2022 results map

2026 results map

== By-election results ==
=== 1964-1968 ===
There were no by-elections.

=== 1968-1971 ===
Consort by-election, 25 July 1968
Party	Candidate	Votes	%	±%
Conservative	D. M. Lang	808	52.7	−0.8
Labour	W. F. Jones	725	47.3	+0.2
Turnout		1,533	14.6	−2.9
Conservative hold		Swing		

=== 1971-1974 ===
There were no by-elections.

=== 1974-1978 ===
Cathedral by-election, 24 April 1975
Party	Candidate	Votes	%	±%
Labour	Stephen Kippin	633	69.8	−2.0
Conservative	Alfred Nuttall	136	15.0	+2.2
National Front	Kevin McDonagh	80	8.8	N/A
Liberal	Thomas Taylor	58	6.4	N/A
Turnout			12.7	−6.5
Labour hold		Swing		

Brunswick by-election, 25 March 1976
Party	Candidate	Votes	%	±%
Labour	Jeremy Gordon	885	49.1	−21.5
Conservative	Tobias Eckersley	446	24.7	+12.7
National Party	Ronald Jackson	252	14.0	N/A
Liberal	Veronica Hunt	220	12.2	±0.0
Turnout			22.6	−0.8
Labour hold		Swing		

Burgess by-election, 20 January 1977
Party	Candidate	Votes	%	±%
Labour	Michael Geater	530	37.9	−32.8
Conservative	Tobias Eckersley	478	34.2	+23.6
National Party	Ronald Jackson	390	27.9	N/A
Turnout			16.0	−4.1
Labour hold		Swing		

Ruskin by-election, 29 September 1977
Party	Candidate	Votes	%	±%
Conservative	Tobias Eckersley	1,580	59.1	+7.1
Labour	Carol Turner	622	23.3	−5.2
Liberal	Brian Seeley	243	9.1	−8.4
National Front	James Sneath	228	8.5	N/A
Turnout			38.7	−9.4
Conservative hold		Swing		

=== 1978-1982 ===
Newington by-election, 21 September 1978
Party	Candidate	Votes	%	±%
Labour	Solomon Parry	781	45.0	−15.7
Conservative	Gerard Fergus	698	40.2	+7.7
National Front	David Teanby	168	9.7	N/A
Liberal	Veronica Hunt	90	5.2	N/A
Turnout			21.2	−6.7
Labour hold		Swing		

The by-election was called following the death of Cllr Cox

Riverside by-election, 30 November 1978
Party	Candidate	Votes	%	±%
Labour	Margaret White	775	68.2	−1.1
Conservative	Alexander Padmore	274	24.1	+3.7
National Front	Leonard Richard	87	7.7	N/A
Turnout			17.2	−18.9
Labour hold		Swing		

The by-election was called following the death of Cllr Flower

Rye by-election, 20 March 1980
Party	Candidate	Votes	%	±%
Labour	Pauline Moore	1,331	47.8	+10.1
Conservative	Richard Clough	1,222	43.9	−5.3
Liberal	Marian Atkinson	230	8.3	+2.2
Turnout			40.4	−3.1
Labour gain from Conservative		Swing		

The by-election was called following the death of Cllr Boxall

The Lane by-election, 5 November 1981
Party	Candidate	Votes	%	±%
Alliance (SDP)	John Lewis	916	47.1	+41.7
Labour	Susan Goss	711	36.6	−21.0
Conservative	Ian Twinn	245	12.6	−12.6
National Front	David Teanby	71	3.7	−5.6
Turnout			33.4	+0.8
Alliance gain from Labour		Swing		

The by-election was called following the resignation of Cllr Brean

=== 1982-1986 ===
Riverside by-election, 10 March 1983
Party	Candidate	Votes	%	±%
Alliance (Liberal)	Ronald Tindall	1,584	56.6	+34.0
Independent Labour	Edward Hart	780	27.8	−6.3
Labour	Michael Idun	233	8.3	−14.0
New Britain	Kevin Mason	118	4.2	N/A
Conservative	Michael Pike	77	2.7	−6.7
Communist	Robert Gordon	9	0.3	N/A
Turnout			43.6	−1.4
Alliance gain from Independent Labour		Swing		

The by-election was called following the resignation of Cllr Patrick

Consort by-election, 8 March 1983
Party	Candidate	Votes	%	±%
Labour	Peter Troy	691	44.7	−9.6
Alliance (Liberal)	Richard Shearman	438	28.3	+11.4
Conservative	Anthony Patterson	339	21.9	+3.7
National Front	Mary Bailey	77	5.0	N/A
Turnout			31.1	±0.0
Labour hold		Swing		

The by-election was called following the resignation of Cllr Smyth

Burgess by-election, 23 February 1984
Party	Candidate	Votes	%	±%
Alliance (Liberal)	Rose Colley	840	53.7	+34.5
Labour	Kevin Joiner	596	38.1	−9.9
Conservative	Beatrice North	81	5.2	−15.6
National Front	Peter Core	47	3.0	N/A
Turnout			34.5	−7.9
Alliance gain from Labour		Swing		

The by-election was called following the resignation of Cllr Slater

Ruskin by-election, 23 February 1984
Party	Candidate	Votes	%	±%
Conservative	Peter Forder	1,714	50.1	−0.4
Labour	Peter Russell	832	24.3	+9.6
Alliance (SDP)	Jonathan Mitchell	791	23.1	−5.5
National Front	Raymond Barker	83	2.4	N/A
Turnout			42.9	−9.6
Conservative hold		Swing		

The by-election was called following the resignation of Cllr Meakin

Lyndhurst by-election, 12 July 1984
Party	Candidate	Votes	%	±%
Labour	Alan Crane	1,423	53.4	+15.4
Conservative	Barry Hallett	656	24.6	−6.5
Alliance (SDP)	Robert Skelly	519	19.5	−4.4
National Front	Raymond Barker	65	2.4	N/A
Turnout			28.9	−10.5
Conservative hold		Swing		

The by-election was called following the resignation of Cllr Moore

Rotherhithe by-election, 13 September 1984
Party	Candidate	Votes	%	±%
Alliance (Liberal)	Frank Pemberton	1,381	60.9	+34.2
Labour	Trevor Lawrence	780	34.4	−12.2
Conservative	Percy Gray	55	2.4	−14.8
National Front	Peter Core	50	2.2	N/A
Turnout			35.2	+4.9
Alliance gain from Labour		Swing		

The by-election was called following the resignation of Cllr Young

Riverside by-election, 15 August 1985
Party	Candidate	Votes	%	±%
Alliance (Liberal)	Michael Hannon	1,656	65.2	+42.5
Labour	John Thomas	801	31.6	+9.3
Conservative	Beatrice North	81	3.2	−6.2
Turnout			38.6	−6.4
Alliance gain from Independent Labour		Swing		

The by-election was called following the resignation of Cllr Burgess

Liddle by-election, 19 December 1985
Party	Candidate	Votes	%	±%
Labour	Mary Ellery	1,032	81.7	+23.3
Alliance (SDP)	Doreen Payne	164	13.0	−0.6
Conservative	Trevor Pitman	67	5.3	−8.3
Turnout			15.5	−4.7
Labour hold		Swing		

The by-election was called following the resignation of Cllr Fowler

=== 1986-1990 ===
Dockyard by-election, 24 July 1986
Party	Candidate	Votes	%	±%
Labour	Thomas Sullivan	1,168	50.1	+6.4
Alliance (Liberal)	Hyman Silverston	1,041	44.7	+0.4
Conservative	Andrew Clayton	72	3.1	−3.3
National Front	John Norris	50	2.1	N/A
Turnout			35.84	−5.5
Labour gain from Alliance		Swing		

The by-election was called following the resignation of Cllr Walker

Liddle by-election, 9 April 1987
Party	Candidate	Votes	%	±%
Labour	Deborah Welch	951	69.8	+0.3
Alliance (SDP)	Ann Harris	292	21.4	+11.2
Conservative	Trevor Atman	120	8.8	+1.4
Turnout			17.19	+7.4
Labour hold		Swing		

The by-election was called following the resignation of Cllr Balli

Rye by-election, 24 September 1987
Party	Candidate	Votes	%	±%
Conservative	Trevor Pitman	1,495	54.8	+17.6
Labour	Christopher Hughes	811	29.8	−9.1
Alliance (SDP)	Robert Skelly	261	9.6	−3.9
Green	Alex Goldie	145	5.3	+0.7
Communist	Linda Osborn	14	0.5	N/A
Turnout			39.45	−7.3
Conservative gain from Labour		Swing		

The by-election was called following the resignation of Cllr Elsie Headley

Chaucer by-election, 25 February 1988
Party	Candidate	Votes	%	±%
Alliance (SDP)	Anna McGettigan	1,365	48.3	+7.1
Labour	Alexander Moore	1,146	40.5	−4.8
Conservative	Nicholas Eriksen	266	9.4	+3.1
Communist	Peter Power	51	1.8	N/A
Turnout			35.47	−1.7
Alliance gain from Labour		Swing		

The by-election was called following the resignation of Cllr Oram

Riverside by-election, 21 April 1988
Party	Candidate	Votes	%	±%
Labour	Coral Newell	1,348	47.0	+10.8
Alliance (Liberal)	George Dunk	1,345	46.8	−3.9
Conservative	Andrew Clayton	129	4.5	−1.9
National Front	Stephen Evans	49	1.7	N/A
Turnout			43.73	+1.1
Labour gain from Alliance		Swing		

The by-election was called following the resignation of Cllr Price

Abbey by-election, 27 October 1988
Party	Candidate	Votes	%	±%
Alliance (Liberal)	Alan Blake	1,240	65.6	+26.5
Labour	John Johnson	514	27.2	−14.7
Conservative	Thomas Pheby	137	7.2	N/A
Turnout			39.79	+0.1
Alliance gain from Labour		Swing		

The by-election was called following the resignation of Cllr Carlisle

Lyndhurst by-election, 17 November 1988
Party	Candidate	Votes	%	±%
Labour	Kate Hoey	1,778	57.7	+5.4
Conservative	Heather Kirby	880	28.5	−0.9
Liberal Democrats	Alex Goldie	327	10.6	−2.2
SDP	Doreen Payne	98	3.2	N/A
Turnout			34.24	−10.8
Labour hold		Swing		

The by-election was called following the resignation of Cllr Crane

Friary by-election, 12 October 1989
Party	Candidate	Votes	%	±%
Labour	Robert Wingfield	810	48.0	−22.3
Independent Labour	Gregory Staunton	567	33.6	N/A
Conservative	Michael Lawson	202	12.0	−1.8
Liberal Democrats	Leroy Arscott	110	6.5	−6.4
Turnout			27.05	−5.8
Labour hold		Swing		

The by-election was called following the resignation of Cllr Main

=== 1990-1994 ===
Brunswick by-election, 25 July 1991
Party	Candidate	Votes	%	±%
Liberal Democrats	Vivien Maurice	1,076	50.8	N/A
Labour	Bernard White	775	36.6	−31.5
Conservative	Michael Bungy	135	6.4	−16.8
BNP	Stephen Tyler	132	6.2	N/A
Turnout			27.8	−4.2
Liberal Democrats gain from Labour		Swing		

The by-election was called following the death of Cllr Maurice.

=== 1994-1998 ===
Browning by-election, 27 April 1995
Party	Candidate	Votes	%	±%
Liberal Democrats	Sarah Gurling	1,378	56.5	−4.0
Labour	Charles Cherrill	855	35.0	−0.7
Ind. Lib Dem	Ronald North	112	4.6	N/A
Conservative	Brooks Newmark	95	3.9	−1.4
Turnout				
Liberal Democrats hold		Swing		

The by-election was called following the resignation of Cllr Munday.

Bellenden by-election, 4 May 1995
Party	Candidate	Votes	%	±%
Labour	Janet Heatley	1,790	73.4	+10.9
Conservative	Sharon Spiers	260	10.7	−1.2
Liberal Democrats	Alexander Baker	257	10.5	−8.8
Ind. Lib Dem	David Osborne	133	5.5	N/A
Turnout				
Labour hold		Swing		

The by-election was called following the resignation of Cllr Lee.

Dockyard by-election, 27 July 1995
Party	Candidate	Votes	%	±%
Liberal Democrats	Sandra Dunk	1,236	60.4	−3.4
Labour	Robert Gasson	642	31.4	+7.1
Conservative	Percy Gray	167	8.2	+1.6
Turnout				
Liberal Democrats hold		Swing		

The by-election was called following the resignation of Cllr Denton.

Friary by-election, 3 August 1995
Party	Candidate	Votes	%	±%
Labour	Barrie Hargrove	909	56.6	+10.5
Liberal Democrats	Caroline Pidgeon	650	40.5	+1.1
Ind. Lib Dem	Jacqueline Tomkins	46	2.9	N/A
Turnout		1,605		
Labour hold		Swing		

The by-election was called following the resignation of Cllr Murison.

Barset by-election, 26 October 1995
Party	Candidate	Votes	%	±%
Labour	Stephanie Elsy	734	77.9	+11.0
Liberal Democrats	David Buxton	118	12.5	−6.3
Conservative	Robert Hayward	90	9.6	−0.9
Turnout				
Labour hold		Swing		

The by-election was called following the resignation of Cllr Kirov.

Chaucer by-election, 7 December 1995
Party	Candidate	Votes	%	±%
Labour	Richard Livingstone	1,125	50.1	+7.3
Liberal Democrats	Robert Skelly	1,025	45.6	+0.2
Independent Green	Doreen Robinson	97	4.3	N/A
Turnout				
Labour gain from Liberal Democrats		Swing		

The by-election was called following the resignation of Cllr Bayne.

Browning by-election, 20 March 1996
Party	Candidate	Votes	%	±%
Liberal Democrats	Joyce Hales	1,191	64.1	+3.3
Labour	Eudora Dixon-Fyle	668	35.9	+0.2
Turnout				
Liberal Democrats hold		Swing		

The by-election was called following the resignation of Cllr Cheesman.

Waverley by-election, 23 October 1997
Party	Candidate	Votes	%	±%
Labour	Michael Barnard	410	79.6	+35.2
Conservative	Rebecca Humphreys	105	20.4	+12.3
Majority		305	59.2	
Turnout		515	11.3	−32.0
Labour hold		Swing		

The by-election was called following the resignation of Cllr Sheilds.

=== 1998-2002 ===
Consort by-election, 15 October 1998
Party	Candidate	Votes	%	±%
Labour	Anne Worsley	919	58.5	+10.2
Liberal Democrats	Colin Hunte	474	30.2	+3.3
Socialist Labour	Angela Ruddock	70	4.5	−3.8
Conservative	Oliver Wooller	54	3.4	−7.1
Liberal	Geoffrey Goldie	53	3.4	N/A
Majority		450	28.3	
Turnout		1,570	34.0	+10.6
Labour hold		Swing		

The by-election was called following the resignation of Cllr Kutapan.

Rotherhithe by-election, 3 December 1998
Party	Candidate	Votes	%	±%
Liberal Democrats	Jeffrey Hook	1,143	55.7	+2.4
Labour	Peter John	813	39.6	+5.9
National Democrats	Gary Cartwright	56	2.7	N/A
Conservative	Steven Bolton	28	1.4	−4.2
Green	Storm Poorun	11	0.5	N/A
Majority		330	16.1	
Turnout		2,051	32.0	+1.7
Liberal Democrats hold		Swing		

The by-election was called following the death of Cllr Jones.

Cathedral by-election, 22 July 1999
Party	Candidate	Votes	%	±%
Liberal Democrats	Stephen Bosch	750	59.6	+10.4
Labour	Bernard Dainton	451	35.9	+10.6
Conservative	Ewan Wallace	57	4.5	+1.1
Majority		299	23.7	
Turnout		1,258	27.0	−6.1
Liberal Democrats hold		Swing		

The by-election was called following the resignation of Cllr Hodson.

=== 2002-2006 ===
East Walworth by-election, 12 February 2004
Party	Candidate	Votes	%	±%
Liberal Democrats	Jane Salmon	1,477	56.1	+2.8
Labour	Rhodri Thomas	978	37.1	+5.3
Conservative	Philip Riches	86	3.3	−1.8
Green	Ruth Jenkins	82	3.1	−0.9
Independent	Julie Crawford	11	0.4	−2.0
Majority		499	19.0	
Turnout		2,634	32.4	
Liberal Democrats hold		Swing		

The by-election was called following the death of Cllr Ambrose.

=== 2006-2010 ===
Riverside by-election, 13 December 2007
Party	Candidate	Votes	%	±%
Liberal Democrats	Anood Al-Samerai	1,114	49.8	+8.4
Labour	Cormac Hollingsworth	691	30.9	+3.6
Conservative	Rahoul Bhansali	260	11.6	−8.9
Green	Amanda Penfold	122	5.5	−11.2
UKIP	Fernando Grace	49	2.2	N/A
Majority		423	18.9	+4.8
Turnout		2,236	24.7	
Liberal Democrats hold		Swing		

The by-election was called following the resignation of Cllr Baichoo.

Rotherhithe by-election, 9 October 2008
Party	Candidate	Votes	%	±%
Liberal Democrats	Wilma Nelson	1,149	56.8	+8.8
Labour	Kath Whittam	618	30.6	+5.1
Conservative	Loanna Morrison	255	12.6	−4.5
Majority		531	26.2	+7.8
Turnout		2,022	23.8	
Liberal Democrats hold		Swing		

The by-election was called following the death of Cllr Yates.

=== 2010-2014 ===
Brunswick Park by-election, 10 March 2011
Party	Candidate	Votes	%	±%
Labour	Mark Williams	1,981	65.1	+10.6
Liberal Democrats	Kate Heywood	630	20.7	−3.2
Green	Jenny Bentall	231	7.6	−6.7
Conservative	Simon Kitchen	129	4.2	−7.3
TUSC	Brian Kelly	70	2.3	N/A
Turnout			34.2%	
Labour hold		Swing		

The by-election was called following the resignation of Cllr Friary.

The Lane by-election, 5 May 2011
Party	Candidate	Votes	%	±%
Labour	Rowenna Davis	2,670	64.4	+23.1
Green	Anna Plodowski	472	11.4	−3.2
Liberal Democrats	Alex Berhanu	471	11.4	−14.7
Conservative	Simon Fox	423	10.2	−2.1
TUSC	Brian Kelly	107	2.6	N/A
Turnout			39.6	
Labour hold		Swing		

The by-election was called following the resignation of Cllr Rhoden.

Peckham by-election, 7 July 2011
Party	Candidate	Votes	%	±%
Labour	Chris Brown	1,754	70.1	+7.4
Liberal Democrats	Jennifer Blake	554	22.1	+3.2
Conservative	Diana Atuona	86	3.4	−5.7
TUSC	Brian J. Kelly	63	2.5	N/A
Green	Jason Harvey-Evers	46	1.8	−4.7
Turnout			25.5%	
Labour hold		Swing		

The by-election was called following the death of Cllr Situ.

East Walworth by-election, 29 November 2012
Party	Candidate	Votes	%	±%
Labour	Rebecca Lury	1,259	53.4	+10.4
Liberal Democrats	Ben Johnson	1,003	42.6	+2.5
Conservative	Stuart Millson	94	4.0	−8.0
Turnout		2,371	25.4%	
Labour hold		Swing		

The by-election was called following the death of Cllr Morrissey.

=== 2014-2018 ===
Chaucer by-election, 7 May 2015
Party	Candidate	Votes	%	±%
Labour	Helen Dennis	2,951	43.5	−0.8
Liberal Democrats	William Houngbo	1,532	22.6	−9.6
Conservative	Michael Dowsett	1,178	17.3	+6.8
Green	Gareth Rees	564	8.3	−9.7
UKIP	Dean Conway	474	7.0	N/A
Independent	Piers Corbyn	67	1.0	N/A
All People's Party	Ade Lasaki	25	0.4	N/A
Majority		1,419	20.9	+16.6
Turnout			63.9	
Labour hold		Swing		

The by-election was called following the resignation of Councillor Maugham.

College by-election, 7 May 2016
Party	Candidate	Votes	%	±%
Labour	Catherine Rose	2,258	45.7	−10.6
Conservative	Kate Bramson	1,269	25.7	−6.0
Liberal Democrats	Brigid Gardner	699	14.1	+8.7
Green	Dale Rapley	371	7.5	−2.1
UKIP	Toby Prescott	318	6.4	N/A
All People's Party	Michael Dowsett	25	0.5	N/A
Majority		989	20.0	+2.8
Turnout			58.4	
Labour hold		Swing		

The by-election was called following the resignation of Cllr Helen Hayes, the Member of Parliament for Dulwich and West Norwood.

Newington by-election, 13 May 2016
Party	Candidate	Votes	%	±%
Labour	James Coldwell	2,829	59.3	+6.5
Liberal Democrats	Martin Shapland	694	14.5	−9.5
Green	Nick Hooper	464	9.7	−3.8
Conservative	Gige Aarons	458	9.6	+1.5
UKIP	Gawain Towler	237	5.0	−0.9
All People's Party	Terry Adewale	45	0.9	N/A
Independent	Michelle Baharier	45	0.9	N/A
Majority		2,135	44.8	+19.7
Turnout			46.1	
Labour hold		Swing		

The by election was called following the resignation of Cllr Neil Coyle, the Member of Parliament for Bermondsey and Old Southwark.

Surrey Docks by-election, 9 June 2016
Party	Candidate	Votes	%	±%
Liberal Democrats	Dan Whitehead	1,523	51.7	+24.4
Labour	Will Holmes	619	21.3	−1.9
Conservative	Craig Cox	380	12.9	−8.5
Green	Colin Boyle	218	7.4	−8.5
UKIP	Toby Prescott	187	6.3	−10.1
Independent	John Hellings	10	0.3	−15.2
Majority		904	30.4	+28.1
Turnout			29.9	
Liberal Democrats hold		Swing		

The by-election was called following the resignation of Cllr Rajan.

=== 2018-2022 ===
There were no by-elections during this period.

=== 2022-2026 ===
Newington by-election, 29 June 2023
Party	Candidate	Votes	%	±%
Labour	Youcef Hassaine	1,524	57.6	−7.2
Liberal Democrats	Vikas Aggarwal	738	27.9	+14.0
Green	Ruben Buendia	237	9.0	−4.0
Conservative	Lewis Jones	149	5.6	−2.7
Majority		786	29.7	
Turnout		2,648		
Labour hold		Swing		

The by-election was called following the resignation of Cllr Alice Macdonald.

Faraday by-election, 4 July 2024
Party	Candidate	Votes	%	±%
Labour	Mohamed Deen	2,201	58.4	
Green	Catherine Dawkins	952	25.3	
Liberal Democrats	Dhiren Ponnambalam	315	8.4	
Conservative	Jordan Abdi	301	8.0	
Majority		1,249	33.1	
Turnout		3,769		
Labour hold		Swing		

The by-election was called following the resignation of Cllr McIntosh.

Rye Lane by-election, 4 July 2024
Party	Candidate	Votes	%	±%
Labour	David Parton	3,349	53.5	
Green	Claire Sheppard	2,015	32.2	
Liberal Democrats	Max Shillam	458	7.3	
Conservative	Peter Felix	438	7.0	
Majority		1,334	21.3	
Turnout		6,260		
Labour hold		Swing		

The by-election was called following the resignation of Cllr Tomlinson.
