= 1986 Southwark London Borough Council election =

1986 local election in England

1986 Southwark Council election
- 8 May 1986

All council seats
	First party	Second party	Third party
Party	Labour	Alliance	Conservative
Seats won	43	15	6
Seat change	▼10	▲15	▼2
Popular vote	32,906	18,696	11,726
Percentage	50.68%	28.8%	18.06%
Swing	▲7.93	▲4.46	▼9.89
Council Control before election
Labour
Council Control
Labour

Elections to Southwark Council were held in May 1986. The whole council was up for election. Turnout was 36.7%.

== Election result ==

Southwark local election result 1986
Party	Seats	Gains	Losses	Net gain/loss	Seats %	Votes %	Votes	+/−
Labour	43	2	12	▼10	67.2	50.68	32,906	▲7.93
Alliance	15	15	0	▲15	23.4	28.8	18,696	▲4.46
Conservative	6	0	2	▼2	9.4	18.06	11,726	▼9.89
Green	0	0	0	Steady	0	2.06	1,336	New
Communist	0	0	0	Steady	0	0.18	116	▼0.57
National Front	0	0	0	Steady	0	0.12	77	▼0.32
Revolutionary Communist	0	0	0	Steady	0	0.11	70	New
Independent Labour	0	0	3	▼3	0	0	0	▼1.93

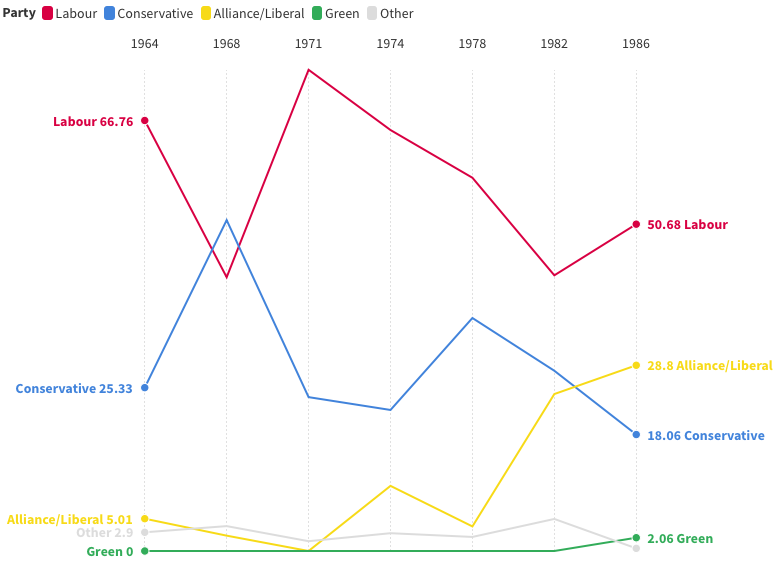
Southwark Council voting history

== Ward results ==
=== Abbey ===
Abbey (2)
Party	Candidate	Votes	%	±%
Alliance (SDP)	James Hughes	1,018	53.4	+29.9
Labour	Kenneth Carlisle	799	41.9	−9.4
Alliance (Liberal)	Phoebe Whiffing	744	39.1	+14.7
Labour	Chetan Patel	706	37.1	−7.7
Turnout		1,905	39.7	+9.3
Alliance gain from Labour		Swing		
Labour hold		Swing		

=== Alleyn ===
Alleyn (2)
Party	Candidate	Votes	%	±%
Labour	David Bogle	1,188	43.6	+7.9
Labour	Margaret Pedler	1,133	41.6	+7.2
Conservative	Pamela Cooper*	781	28.7	−6.2
Conservative	Maureen Tomison	718	26.4	−7.2
Alliance (Liberal)	Jean Halden	521	19.1	−3.4
Alliance (Liberal)	James Morrey	496	18.2	−4.2
Turnout		2,722	46.8	+7.4
Labour hold		Swing		
Labour gain from Conservative		Swing		

=== Barset ===
Barset (2)
Party	Candidate	Votes	%	±%
Labour	Nicholas Snow*	1,184	58.4	+10.8
Labour	Dorothy Winters	1,070	52.8	+4.5
Alliance (Liberal)	Roy Nightingale	537	26.5	−4.1
Alliance (Liberal)	David Banks	534	26.3	−2.3
Conservative	Barbara Ellams	210	10.4	−5.1
Conservative	Archibald Norman	202	10.0	−5.4
Turnout		2,027	41.5	+5.6
Labour hold		Swing		
Labour hold		Swing		

=== Bellenden ===
Bellenden (3)
Party	Candidate	Votes	%	±%
Labour	Graeme Geddes**	1,953	54.1	+13.7
Labour	John McTernan	1,942	53.8	+15.0
Labour	Jessica Wanamaker**	1,849	51.2	+13.1
Conservative	Alfred Shaughnessy	821	22.7	−9.3
Conservative	Pamela Entwhistle	809	22.4	−8.6
Conservative	David Bradbury	797	22.1	−8.1
Alliance (SDP)	Paul Eden	545	15.1	−3.8
Alliance (SDP)	Kathryn Kyle	513	14.2	−3.4
Alliance (SDP)	Leaford Patrick	451	12.5	−4.7
Green	David Brunsdon	231	6.4	N/A
Turnout		3,610	40.8	+2.5
Labour hold		Swing		
Labour hold		Swing		
Labour hold		Swing		

Graeme Geddes was a sitting councillor for Browning ward

Jessica Wanamaker was a sitting councillor for Chaucer ward

=== Bricklayers ===
Bricklayers (2)
Party	Candidate	Votes	%	±%
Alliance (Liberal)	Andrew Canning	1,576	53.0	+21.3
Alliance (Liberal)	Helen Kemp	1,521	51.2	+21.6
Labour	John Bryan*	1,199	40.3	−0.3
Labour	Robert Law	1,136	38.2	±0.0
Communist	Peter Power	33	1.1	N/A
Turnout		2,973	50.1	+16.1
Alliance gain from Labour		Swing		
Alliance gain from Labour		Swing		

=== Browning ===
Browning (3)
Party	Candidate	Votes	%	±%
Labour	David Fryer*	1,446	45.7	−6.1
Labour	Ann Goss**	1,373	43.4	−9.8
Alliance (Liberal)	Peter Pritchard	1,373	43.4	+24.7
Alliance (Liberal)	Joyce Hales	1,361	43.0	+25.1
Labour	Laurence Hemming	1,354	42.8	−8.0
Alliance (SDP)	Mary Wenner	1,228	38.8	+21.9
Conservative	Malcolm Trott	212	6.7	−13.1
Conservative	Terence Driscoll	204	6.4	−13.2
Turnout		3,163	42.9	+13.3
Labour hold		Swing		
Labour hold		Swing		
Alliance gain from Labour		Swing		

Ann Goss was a sitting councillor for The Lane ward

=== Brunswick ===
Brunswick (3)
Party	Candidate	Votes	%	±%
Labour	Jessie Cannon*	1,556	57.4	+14.8
Labour	John Maurice	1,543	57.0	+20.3
Labour	John Lauder*	1,522	56.2	+10.1
Alliance (SDP)	Richard Cotton	671	24.8	+0.4
Alliance (SDP)	Simon Gamble	651	24.0	+1.1
Alliance (Liberal)	Warren Ingham-Barrow	617	22.8	+0.3
Conservative	John McMahon	337	12.4	−8.1
Conservative	Carolyn Freeman	316	11.7	−7.4
Conservative	Douglas Mitchell	304	11.2	−8.9
Communist	Eric Hodson	83	3.1	−0.7
Turnout		2,709	35.6	+8.5
Labour hold		Swing		
Labour hold		Swing		
Labour hold		Swing		

=== Burgess ===
Burgess (2)
Party	Candidate	Votes	%	±%
Alliance (Liberal)	Rose Colley*	943	51.8	+32.6
Labour	Piers Corbyn	835	45.8	−4.9
Alliance (Liberal)	Anne Scovell	816	44.8	+27.0
Labour	Reginald Gyasi	736	40.4	−7.6
Turnout		1,822	41.8	+15.2
Alliance gain from Labour		Swing		
Labour hold		Swing		

=== Cathedral ===
Cathedral (2)
Party	Candidate	Votes	%	±%
Alliance (Liberal)	Hilary Wines	905	41.4	+21.0
Labour	Geoffrey Williams*	899	41.1	−6.4
Labour	Alan Davis*	883	40.4	−6.8
Alliance (Liberal)	Leroy Arscott	850	38.9	+19.8
Conservative	Richard Skelton	231	10.6	−15.7
Turnout		2,185	39.7	+11.2
Alliance gain from Labour		Swing		
Labour hold		Swing		

=== Chaucer ===
Chaucer (3)
Party	Candidate	Votes	%	±%
Labour	Anne Matthews*	1,478	47.8	+8.6
Labour	Rita Sergeant	1,431	46.3	+3.1
Labour	Linda Oram	1,400	45.3	+6.7
Alliance (SDP)	Richard Malins	1,328	43.0	+14.7
Alliance (SDP)	Anna McGettigan	1,274	41.2	+13.6
Alliance (SDP)	Loraine Watson	1,228	39.7	+13.5
Conservative	Beatrice North	195	6.3	−10.3
Conservative	Caroline Sayer	177	5.7	−11.7
Turnout		3,090	37.2	+1.9
Labour hold		Swing		
Labour hold		Swing		
Labour hold		Swing		

=== College ===
College (2)
Party	Candidate	Votes	%	±%
Conservative	Eileen Doran	1,486	47.6	−5.7
Conservative	Percy Gray	1,410	45.2	−5.9
Labour	Peter Bowyer	909	29.1	+6.4
Labour	Iris Ritchie	871	27.9	+7.9
Alliance (Liberal)	Patricia Mynott	597	19.1	−1.9
Alliance (SDP)	Olga Kenyon	583	18.7	−2.7
Turnout		3,120	51.4	+1.7
Conservative hold		Swing		
Conservative hold		Swing		

=== Consort ===
Consort (2)
Party	Candidate	Votes	%	±%
Labour	Michael Brennan	1,077	64.3	+9.4
Labour	Sally Keeble	1,019	60.8	+6.5
Alliance (Liberal)	Mark Allen	293	17.5	+0.6
Alliance (Liberal)	Martin Horwood	277	16.5	+2.3
Conservative	Leslie Brown	229	13.7	−4.5
Conservative	Christine Alderton	192	11.5	−6.3
Turnout		1,676	33.2	+2.1
Labour hold		Swing		
Labour hold		Swing		

=== Dockyard ===
Dockyard (3)
Party	Candidate	Votes	%	±%
Alliance (Liberal)	Ronald Kendrick	1,236	45.9	+25.9
Alliance (Liberal)	Patricia Matheson	1,226	45.5	+27.0
Alliance (Liberal)	George Walker	1,195	44.3	+26.9
Labour	Thomas Sullivan*	1,178	43.7	−12.3
Labour	John Burke	1,119	41.5	−18.3
Labour	Rupert Doyle**	1,095	40.6	−12.6
Conservative	Mary Corps	173	6.4	−7.7
Conservative	Alan Corps	169	6.3	−6.4
Turnout		2,695	41.3	+7.9
Alliance gain from Labour		Swing		
Alliance gain from Labour		Swing		
Alliance gain from Labour		Swing		

Rupert Doyle was a sitting councillor for Friary ward

=== Faraday ===
Faraday (3)
Party	Candidate	Votes	%	±%
Labour	Maurice Elley	1,939	64.9	+11.2
Labour	Patrick Morgan	1,928	64.5	+17.0
Labour	David Payne*	1,897	63.5	+13.7
Alliance (Liberal)	Peter Duff	440	14.7	−8.0
Conservative	Gladys Cobley	414	13.9	−6.8
Alliance (Liberal)	Veronica Hunt	414	13.9	N/A
Alliance (Liberal)	Jonathan Hunt	413	13.8	N/A
Conservative	Peter Grady	398	13.3	−10.8
Conservative	Harold Welch	371	12.4	−4.9
Green	Sylvia Brasier	149	5.0	N/A
Turnout		2,988	31.6	+9.3
Labour hold		Swing		
Labour hold		Swing		
Labour hold		Swing		

=== Friary ===
Friary (3)
Party	Candidate	Votes	%	±%
Labour	David Main*	1,453	70.3	+21.8
Labour	Marjorie Henriquez	1,444	69.9	+18.6
Labour	Tony Goss**	1,423	68.8	+22.4
Conservative	Christopher Mead	285	13.8	−6.4
Alliance (SDP)	Paul Cheesman	267	12.9	−7.8
Conservative	Joe Mortimer	261	12.6	−5.2
Alliance (SDP)	Roy Ashworth	253	12.2	−7.6
Conservative	Robert Myers	238	11.5	−5.9
Alliance (Liberal)	Frances Sheehan	235	11.4	−7.5
Turnout		2,067	32.9	+4.5
Labour hold		Swing		
Labour hold		Swing		
Labour hold		Swing		

Tony Goss was a sitting councillor for Newington ward

=== Liddle ===
Liddle (3)
Party	Candidate	Votes	%	±%
Labour	Mary Ellery*	1,603	79.3	+20.9
Labour	Daniel McCarthy*	1,476	73.0	+14.4
Labour	Ali Balli	1,405	69.5	+18.0
Alliance (SDP)	Irene Barton	206	10.2	−5.6
Alliance (SDP)	Peter Ward	187	9.2	−4.4
Alliance (SDP)	Iain Johncock	153	7.6	−4.5
Conservative	Norman Bascombe	149	7.4	−6.2
Conservative	Victoria Holliday	132	6.5	−5.6
Conservative	Mary Welch	108	5.3	−6.5
Turnout		2,022	24.6	+4.4
Labour hold		Swing		
Labour hold		Swing		
Labour hold		Swing		

=== Lyndhurst ===
Lyndhurst (3)
Party	Candidate	Votes	%	±%
Labour	Alan Crane*	2,164	52.3	+14.3
Labour	Andrew Troke*	2,145	51.8	+18.1
Labour	Aubyn Graham*	2,116	51.1	+15.6
Conservative	Elizabeth Betts	1,218	29.4	−1.7
Conservative	Tobias Eckersley**	1,193	28.8	−0.9
Conservative	Doris Pearce	1,167	28.2	−2.9
Alliance (SDP)	Rowland Sheard	531	12.8	−11.1
Alliance (SDP)	Margaret Hanton	526	12.7	−9.7
Alliance (SDP)	Joan Wheeler	497	12.0	−9.7
Turnout		4,139	45.0	+5.6
Labour hold		Swing		
Labour hold		Swing		
Labour hold		Swing		

Tobias Eckersley was a sitting councillor for Ruskin ward

=== Newington ===
Newington (3)
Party	Candidate	Votes	%	±%
Labour	Roy Kennedy	1,960	60.1	+15.6
Labour	Mark Howarth	1,946	59.6	+17.3
Labour	Jeremy Fraser	1,919	58.8	+17.2
Alliance (Liberal)	John Clemens	476	14.6	−4.0
Conservative	Stephen Payne	473	14.5	−4.6
Conservative	Clive Jones	459	14.1	−3.9
Alliance (Liberal)	Diana Jenkins	438	13.4	−0.4
Alliance (Liberal)	Gillian Clemens	433	13.3	−4.4
Conservative	Miranda Picarda	385	11.8	−4.7
Turnout		3,263	37.2	+4.9
Labour hold		Swing		
Labour hold		Swing		
Labour hold		Swing		

=== Riverside ===
Riverside (3)
Party	Candidate	Votes	%	±%
Alliance (Liberal)	Michael Hannon*	1,492	54.3	+31.6
Alliance (Liberal)	Michael Heaney	1,429	52.0	+29.4
Alliance (Liberal)	Joan Price	1,393	50.7	+29.5
Labour	Thomas Gregory	995	36.2	+13.9
Labour	Melvyn Brookstone	977	35.6	+14.0
Labour	David Brockman	905	33.0	+12.0
Conservative	Andrew Clayton	175	6.4	−3.0
Conservative	Bertram Williams	99	3.6	−5.6
Turnout		2,746	42.6	−2.4
Alliance gain from Independent Labour		Swing		
Alliance gain from Independent Labour		Swing		
Alliance gain from Independent Labour		Swing		

=== Rotherhithe ===
Rotherhithe (3)
Party	Candidate	Votes	%	±%
Alliance (Liberal)	Frank Pemberton*	1,526	56.0	+29.3
Alliance (Liberal)	Victor Jones	1,353	49.6	+22.9
Alliance (Liberal)	Richard Shearman	1,283	47.0	+24.0
Labour	William Carter	1,006	36.9	−9.7
Labour	David Brasier*	992	36.4	−9.1
Labour	William Griffiths	963	35.3	−9.4
National Front	Raymond Barker	77	2.8	N/A
National Front	Anthony Grant	76	2.8	N/A
Turnout		2,727	44.4	+14.1
Alliance gain from Labour		Swing		
Alliance gain from Labour		Swing		
Alliance gain from Labour		Swing		

=== Ruskin ===
Ruskin (3)
Party	Candidate	Votes	%	±%
Conservative	Andrew Mitchell	1,963	45.1	−5.4
Conservative	Gerald Hartup	1,924	44.2	−5.9
Conservative	John Edwards	1,885	43.3	−6.4
Labour	Valerie Stagg	1,190	27.3	+12.6
Labour	John Thomas	1,165	26.8	+12.2
Labour	Kevin Williamson	1,062	24.4	+9.9
Alliance (SDP)	Jonathan Mitchell	941	21.6	−7.0
Alliance (SDP)	Deborah Sillett	899	20.6	−8.7
Alliance (SDP)	John Weedy	849	19.5	−9.3
Green	David Smart	412	9.5	N/A
Turnout		4,355	54.8	+2.3
Conservative hold		Swing		
Conservative hold		Swing		
Conservative hold		Swing		

=== Rye ===
Rye (2)
Party	Candidate	Votes	%	±%
Labour	Elsie Headley**	1,246	38.9	+8.5
Conservative	Irene Kimm	1,212	37.9	−5.1
Conservative	Jasper Perry	1,190	37.2	−4.0
Labour	Christopher Hughes	1,186	37.1	+9.0
Alliance (SDP)	Adam Norton	460	14.4	−7.9
Alliance (SDP)	Robert Skelly	431	13.5	−8.7
Green	Alex Goldie	147	4.6	N/A
Turnout		3,199	46.8	+2.3
Labour gain from Conservative		Swing		
Conservative hold		Swing		

Elsie Headley was a sitting councillor for Alleyn ward

=== St Giles ===
St Giles (3)
Party	Candidate	Votes	%	±%
Labour	Anthony Ritchie*	1,956	56.4	+10.4
Labour	Winston Stafford	1,867	53.8	+3.5
Labour	Michael Geater*	1,725	49.7	+4.9
Alliance (Liberal)	John Bennett	955	27.5	+0.4
Alliance (SDP)	John Egan	874	25.2	+3.4
Alliance (SDP)	Andrew Sawdon	860	24.8	+5.1
Conservative	Trevor Pitman	364	10.5	−7.2
Conservative	Richard Turnbull	342	9.9	−7.2
Conservative	Alfred Wood	322	9.3	−7.7
Green	Stephen Barbe	180	5.2	N/A
Revolutionary Communist	Kim Pepper	70	2.0	N/A
Turnout		3,470	37.4	+6.1
Labour hold		Swing		
Labour hold		Swing		
Labour hold		Swing		

=== The Lane ===
The Lane (2)
Party	Candidate	Votes	%	±%
Labour	Leslie Alden**	1,253	46.7	+6.0
Labour	Pamela Smith	1,225	45.6	+8.0
Alliance (Liberal)	Andrew Harris	737	27.4	−1.9
Alliance (Liberal)	David Salmon	735	27.4	−0.2
Conservative	Richard Clough**	421	15.7	−4.7
Conservative	Robert Chamber	409	15.2	−5.0
Turnout		2,685	44.3	+8.8
Labour hold		Swing		
Labour hold		Swing		

Leslie Alden was a sitting councillor for St Giles ward

Richard Clough was a sitting councillor for Rye ward

=== Waverley ===
Waverley (2)
Party	Candidate	Votes	%	±%
Labour	Brian Kelly*	1,419	55.7	+15.4
Labour	Brian McKeon	1,261	49.5	+13.3
Conservative	Lilian Dawson	766	30.1	−6.0
Conservative	Khalid Sharif	734	28.8	−3.8
Green	Doreen Robinson	217	8.5	N/A
Turnout		2,549	44.1	+5.0
Labour hold		Swing		
Labour hold		Swing		

== By-Elections ==
Dockyard by-election, 24 July 1986
Party	Candidate	Votes	%	±%
Labour	Thomas Sullivan	1,168	50.1	+6.4
Alliance (Liberal)	Hyman Silverston	1,041	44.7	+0.4
Conservative	Andrew Clayton	72	3.1	−3.3
National Front	John Norris	50	2.1	N/A
Turnout			35.84	−5.5
Labour gain from Alliance		Swing		

The by-election was called following the resignation of Cllr. George Walker

Liddle by-election, 9 April 1987
Party	Candidate	Votes	%	±%
Labour	Deborah Welch	951	69.8	+0.3
Alliance (SDP)	Ann Harris	292	21.4	+11.2
Conservative	Trevor Atman	120	8.8	+1.4
Turnout			17.19	+7.4
Labour hold		Swing		

The by-election was called following the resignation of Cllr. Ali Balli

Rye by-election, 24 September 1987
Party	Candidate	Votes	%	±%
Conservative	Trevor Pitman	1,495	54.8	+17.6
Labour	Christopher Hughes	811	29.8	−9.1
Alliance (SDP)	Robert Skelly	261	9.6	−3.9
Green	Alex Goldie	145	5.3	+0.7
Communist	Linda Osborn	14	0.5	N/A
Turnout			39.45	−7.3
Conservative gain from Labour		Swing		

The by-election was called following the resignation of Cllr. Elsie Headley

Chaucer by-election, 25 February 1988
Party	Candidate	Votes	%	±%
Alliance (SDP)	Anna McGettigan	1,365	48.3	+7.1
Labour	Alexander Moore	1,146	40.5	−4.8
Conservative	Nicholas Eriksen	266	9.4	+3.1
Communist	Peter Power	51	1.8	N/A
Turnout			35.47	−1.7
Alliance gain from Labour		Swing		

The by-election was called following the resignation of Cllr. Linda Oram

Riverside by-election, 21 April 1988
Party	Candidate	Votes	%	±%
Labour	Coral Newell	1,348	47.0	+10.8
Alliance (Liberal)	George Dunk	1,345	46.8	−3.9
Conservative	Andrew Clayton	129	4.5	−1.9
National Front	Stephen Evans	49	1.7	N/A
Turnout			43.73	+1.1
Labour gain from Alliance		Swing		

The by-election was called following the resignation of Cllr. Joan Price

Abbey by-election, 27 October 1988
Party	Candidate	Votes	%	±%
Alliance (Liberal)	Alan Blake	1,240	65.6	+26.5
Labour	John Johnson	514	27.2	−14.7
Conservative	Thomas Pheby	137	7.2	N/A
Turnout			39.79	+0.1
Alliance gain from Labour		Swing		

The by-election was called following the resignation of Cllr. Kenneth Carlisle

Lyndhurst by-election, 17 November 1988
Party	Candidate	Votes	%	±%
Labour	Kate Hoey	1,778	57.7	+5.4
Conservative	Heather Kirby	880	28.5	−0.9
Liberal Democrats	Alex Goldie	327	10.6	−2.2
SDP	Doreen Payne	98	3.2	N/A
Turnout			34.24	−10.8
Labour hold		Swing		

The by-election was called following the resignation of Cllr. Alan Crane

Friary by-election, 12 October 1989
Party	Candidate	Votes	%	±%
Labour	Robert Wingfield	810	48.0	−22.3
Independent Labour	Gregory Staunton	567	33.6	N/A
Conservative	Michael Lawson	202	12.0	−1.8
Liberal Democrats	Leroy Arscott	110	6.5	−6.4
Turnout			27.05	−5.8
Labour hold		Swing		

The by-election was called following the resignation of Cllr. David Main
