= 1964 Southwark London Borough Council election =

1964 Southwark Council election
- 7 May 1964

All council seats
	First party	Second party
Party	Labour	Conservative
Seats won	64	6
Popular vote	33,024	12,532
Percentage	66.76%	25.33%
Council Control
Labour

The 1964 Southwark Council election took place on 7 May 1964 to elect members of Southwark London Borough Council in London, England. The whole council was up for election and the Labour party gained control of the council.

== Background ==
These elections were the first to the newly formed borough. Previously elections had taken place in the Metropolitan Borough of Bermondsey, Metropolitan Borough of Camberwell and Metropolitan Borough of Southwark. These boroughs were joined to form the new London Borough of Southwark by the London Government Act 1963.

A total of 144 candidates stood in the election for the 60 seats being contested across 22 wards. These included a full slate from the Labour party, while the Conservative and Liberal parties stood 57 and 16 respectively. Other candidates included 11 from the Communist party. There were 14 three-seat wards, 7 two-seat wards and 1 four-seat ward.

This election had aldermen as well as directly elected councillors. Labour got all 10 aldermen.

The Council was elected in 1964 as a "shadow authority" but did not start operations until 1 April 1965.

== Election result ==
The results saw Labour gain the new council with a majority of 48 after winning 54 of the 60 seats. Overall turnout in the election was 23.6%. This turnout included 599 postal votes.

Southwark local election result 1964
Party	Seats	Gains	Losses	Net gain/loss	Seats %	Votes %	Votes	+/−
Labour	64	-	-	-	91.4	66.76	33,024	-
Conservative	6	-	-	-	8.6	25.33	12,532	-
Liberal	0	-	-	-	0.0	5.01	2,478	-
Communist	0	-	-	-	0.0	2.90	1,433	-

== Ward results ==
=== Abbey ===
Abbey (3)
Party	Candidate	Votes	%	±%
Labour	J. Mahoney	1,945	90.0	
Labour	C.A. Sawyer	1,939	89.8	
Labour	F. Ackland	1,916	88.7	
Communist	Mrs L. Patrick	215	10.0	
Turnout		2,160	20.7	
Labour win (new seat)				
Labour win (new seat)				
Labour win (new seat)				

=== Alleyn ===
Alleyn (2)
Party	Candidate	Votes	%	±%
Labour	P. Cather	1,128	55.0	
Labour	E. Hargest	1,113	54.2	
Conservative	J. Kaufman	665	32.4	
Conservative	J. Parker	665	32.4	
Liberal	N.J. Clover	228	11.1	
Liberal	R.H. Brown	222	10.8	
Turnout		2,052	31.9	
Labour win (new seat)				
Labour win (new seat)				

=== Bellenden ===
Bellenden (3)
Party	Candidate	Votes	%	±%
Labour	D.J.V. Moore	1,670	54.6	
Labour	Mrs N. Reed	1,668	54.5	
Labour	F.E. Lee	1,651	54.0	
Conservative	B.B. Leach	983	32.1	
Conservative	W. Bicknell	963	31.5	
Conservative	A.G. Sinclair	940	30.7	
Liberal	G.H. Brown	404	13.2	
Liberal	A.E. Bond	378	12.4	
Liberal	E.A. Hemming	370	12.1	
Turnout		3,058	28.6	
Labour win (new seat)				
Labour win (new seat)				
Labour win (new seat)				

=== Bricklayers ===
Bricklayers (3)
Party	Candidate	Votes	%	±%
Labour	Miss E. Greenwood	2,256	86.9	
Labour	L.A.J. Henley	2,212	85.2	
Labour	W. Nicklin	2,193	84.5	
Conservative	Mrs L. Coombs	297	11.4	
Conservative	G.G. Colbran	275	10.6	
Conservative	P. Flowerdew	269	10.4	
Communist	H. Barr	82	3.2	
Turnout		2,596	19.9	
Labour win (new seat)				
Labour win (new seat)				
Labour win (new seat)				

=== Browning ===
Browning (3)
Party	Candidate	Votes	%	±%
Labour	J.S. Lees	1,433	76.6	
Labour	D. Fifer	1,417	75.8	
Labour	Mrs T. Soltesz	1,355	72.5	
Communist	S.P. Bent	321	17.2	
Conservative	A. Morgan	253	13.5	
Conservative	A.I. Robin	248	13.3	
Conservative	J. Wallington	222	11.9	
Turnout		1,870	17.4	
Labour win (new seat)				
Labour win (new seat)				
Labour win (new seat)				

=== Brunswick ===
Brunswick (3)
Party	Candidate	Votes	%	±%
Labour	A. Knight	1,591	80.3	
Labour	E. Button	1,589	80.2	
Labour	E.W. Pruce	1,563	78.9	
Conservative	C.B. Cumming	297	15.0	
Conservative	R. Burden	284	14.3	
Conservative	H. Innes	280	14.1	
Communist	G. Plummer	134	6.8	
Turnout		1,982	18.3	
Labour win (new seat)				
Labour win (new seat)				
Labour win (new seat)				

=== Burgess ===
Burgess (3)
Party	Candidate	Votes	%	±%
Labour	Mrs J.E. Cannon	1,700	86.4	
Labour	Mrs A.E. Pritchard	1,694	86.1	
Labour	R. Richards	1,679	85.3	
Conservative	K. Bowden	167	8.5	
Conservative	T. Lane	158	8.0	
Conservative	J. Beattie	147	7.5	
Communist	P.J. Hicks	110	5.6	
Turnout		1,968	18.1	
Labour win (new seat)				
Labour win (new seat)				
Labour win (new seat)				

=== Cathedral ===
Cathedral (3)
Party	Candidate	Votes	%	±%
Labour	C.C. Gates	1,109	80.8	
Labour	Mrs A. Evans	1,086	79.1	
Labour	Miss J. Barbara	1,060	77.2	
Conservative	H. Golding	214	15.6	
Conservative	L.E. Monkhouse	206	15.0	
Conservative	F.N. Richardson	192	14.0	
Communist	A. Rolle	71	5.2	
Turnout		1,373	16.2	
Labour win (new seat)				
Labour win (new seat)				
Labour win (new seat)				

=== Chaucer ===
Chaucer (3)
Party	Candidate	Votes	%	±%
Labour	A. Knight	1,104	77.6	
Labour	E. Button	1,073	75.4	
Labour	N.H. Tertis	1,063	74.7	
Conservative	Mrs D.E. Geddes	266	18.7	
Conservative	D.M. Lang	241	16.9	
Conservative	J. Gordon	240	16.9	
Communist	T. Fuller	122	8.6	
Turnout		1,423	16.3	
Labour win (new seat)				
Labour win (new seat)				
Labour win (new seat)				

=== Consort ===
Consort (3)
Party	Candidate	Votes	%	±%
Labour	A.P. Chambers	1,731	68.8	
Labour	H. Bolt	1,718	68.3	
Labour	F.J. Francis	1,692	67.3	
Conservative	G.R. Blake	759	30.2	
Conservative	G. Scott	711	28.3	
Conservative	Miss F. Tristram	682	27.1	
Communist	E. Hodson	87	3.5	
Turnout		2,515	21.9	
Labour win (new seat)				
Labour win (new seat)				
Labour win (new seat)				

=== Dockyard ===
Dockyard (2)
Party	Candidate	Votes	%	±%
Labour	John H. O'Grady	1,466	85.8	
Labour	Mrs L.M. Brown	1,459	85.4	
Conservative	Mrs J. Brown	225	13.2	
Conservative	Rev. P. Gray	204	11.9	
Turnout		1,708	28.0	
Labour win (new seat)				
Labour win (new seat)				

=== Faraday ===
Faraday (3)
Party	Candidate	Votes	%	±%
Labour	S.R. Combes	1,893	83.2	
Labour	J.T. Greening	1,877	82.5	
Labour	Rev. H.W. Hinds	1,852	81.4	
Conservative	C.C. Keene	279	12.3	
Conservative	S.H. Smith	274	12.0	
Conservative	P. Noble	269	11.8	
Communist	Mrs F. Braithwaite	80	3.5	
Turnout		2,276	18.0	
Labour win (new seat)				
Labour win (new seat)				
Labour win (new seat)				

=== Friary ===
Friary (4)
Party	Candidate	Votes	%	±%
Labour	F.A. Goldwin	1,856	82.5	
Labour	R.A. Cheesewright	1,842	81.9	
Labour	W.F. Jones	1,839	81.8	
Labour	Mrs M.V. Goldwin	1,830	81.4	
Conservative	C. Knaggs	331	14.7	
Conservative	S.M. Barton	327	14.5	
Conservative	G. McAllister	327	14.5	
Conservative	Mrs C.E. Pitman	322	14.3	
Turnout		2,249	17.1	
Labour win (new seat)				
Labour win (new seat)				
Labour win (new seat)				
Labour win (new seat)				

=== Lyndhurst ===
Lyndhurst (3)
Party	Candidate	Votes	%	±%
Labour	Miss J. Cuckney	1,972	57.6	
Labour	Mrs A. Inman	1,916	55.9	
Labour	A. Robinson	1,902	55.5	
Conservative	Miss M. North	1,046	30.5	
Conservative	F. Rehder	1,029	30.0	
Conservative	Miss A. Webber	1,012	29.5	
Liberal	Mrs U.A. Redman	429	12.5	
Liberal	Mrs W. Hammond	393	11.5	
Liberal	G.G. Cook	376	11.0	
Communist	W. Macfarlane	75	2.2	
Turnout		3,426	30.5	
Labour win (new seat)				
Labour win (new seat)				
Labour win (new seat)				

=== Newington ===
Newington (3)
Party	Candidate	Votes	%	±%
Labour	C.A.G. Halford	1,631	80.0	
Labour	J.A. Matheson	1,609	78.9	
Labour	Mrs C.M. Clunn	1,585	77.7	
Conservative	Mrs R. Cummins	337	16.5	
Conservative	G. Coomber	309	15.1	
Conservative	J. Pound	273	13.4	
Communist	T. Protheroe	136	6.7	
Turnout		2,040	19.0	
Labour win (new seat)				
Labour win (new seat)				
Labour win (new seat)				

=== Riverside ===
Riverside (2)
Party	Candidate	Votes	%	±%
Labour	Mrs E. Coyle	1,505	86.8	
Labour	F. Florance	1,490	86.0	
Conservative	Miss A. Bowles	218	12.6	
Conservative	Miss H.C.A. Mitchell	192	11.1	
Turnout		1,733	22.6	
Labour win (new seat)				
Labour win (new seat)				

=== Rotherhithe ===
Rotherhithe (3)
Party	Candidate	Votes	%	±%
Labour	W.L. Ellis	1,450	89.8	
Labour	E. Rowe	1,419	87.9	
Labour	F. Creswick	1,400	86.7	
Conservative	C. Hayward	176	10.9	
Conservative	T. Judd	143	8.9	
Conservative	F. Morgan	126	7.8	
Turnout		1,615	18.5	
Labour win (new seat)				
Labour win (new seat)				
Labour win (new seat)				

=== Ruskin ===
Ruskin (2)
Party	Candidate	Votes	%	±%
Conservative	Mrs H.E. Day	1,756	58.7	
Conservative	J. Cullingham	1,727	57.7	
Labour	R. Keene	736	24.6	
Labour	P. Moore	725	24.2	
Liberal	A.C. Stobie	504	16.8	
Liberal	M.C. Nelson	493	16.5	
Turnout		2,993	43.1	
Conservative win (new seat)				
Conservative win (new seat)				

=== Rye ===
Rye (2)
Party	Candidate	Votes	%	±%
Conservative	T.F.H. Jessel	1,686	54.3	
Conservative	R. Ames	1,612	51.9	
Labour	J. Fisher	1,047	33.7	
Labour	G. Byfield	1,031	33.2	
Liberal	D.J. Hazell	366	11.8	
Liberal	J.F. Hayes	354	11.4	
Turnout		3,104	41.8	
Conservative win (new seat)				
Conservative win (new seat)				

=== St Giles ===
St Giles (3)
Party	Candidate	Votes	%	±%
Labour	Mrs E.M. Dalton	1,374	67.1	
Labour	R. Wedlake	1,342	65.6	
Labour	F.T. Rolfe	1,336	65.3	
Conservative	M.P. Mulligan	667	32.6	
Conservative	B. Jordan	635	31.1	
Conservative	T. Percival	604	29.5	
Turnout		2,045	19.1	
Labour win (new seat)				
Labour win (new seat)				
Labour win (new seat)				

=== The College ===
The College (2)
Party	Candidate	Votes	%	±%
Conservative	B.G.J. Hoskins	1,586	48.7	
Conservative	H. Grant	1,579	48.4	
Labour	J. Booker	1,388	42.6	
Labour	P. Healy	1,368	42.0	
Liberal	C.H. Bloy	280	8.6	
Liberal	R. Seligman	272	8.3	
Turnout		3,260	45.8	
Conservative win (new seat)				
Conservative win (new seat)				

=== Waverley ===
Waverley (2)
Party	Candidate	Votes	%	±%
Labour	H.T. Ball	1,403	58.0	
Labour	E. Corderoy	1,390	57.5	
Conservative	E. Easdown	659	27.2	
Conservative	A. Hollands	655	27.1	
Liberal	L.F. LaLonde	340	14.1	
Liberal	J.F. Sutton	329	13.6	
Turnout		2,419	32.2	
Labour win (new seat)				
Labour win (new seat)				

== See also ==
- 1964 Greater London Council election
