= 1974 Southwark London Borough Council election =

1974 Southwark Council election
- 2 May 1974

All council seats
	First party	Second party
Party	Labour	Conservative
Seats won	66	4
Seat change	▼2	▲2
Popular vote	31,604	10,586
Percentage	65.28%	21.87%
Swing	▼9.34%	▼1.99%
Council Control before election
Labour
Council Control
Labour

Elections to Southwark Council were held in May 1974. The whole council was up for election. Turnout was 24.2%.

This was the last local election to feature aldermen as well as councillors. Labour got all ten aldermen as well as 56 elected councillors.

== Election result ==

Southwark local election result 1974
Party	Seats	Gains	Losses	Net gain/loss	Seats %	Votes %	Votes	+/−
Labour	66	0	2	▼2		65.28	31,604	▼9.34
Conservative	4	2	0	▲2		21.87	10,586	▼1.99
Liberal	0	0	0	Steady	0.00	10.10	4,890	New
Communist	0	0	0	Steady	0.00	0.97	472	▼0.34
Ind. Ratepayers	0	0	0	Steady	0.00	0.90	434	New
National Front	0	0	0	Steady	0.00	0.61	294	▲0.4
Independent	0	0	0	Steady	0.00	0.28	135	New

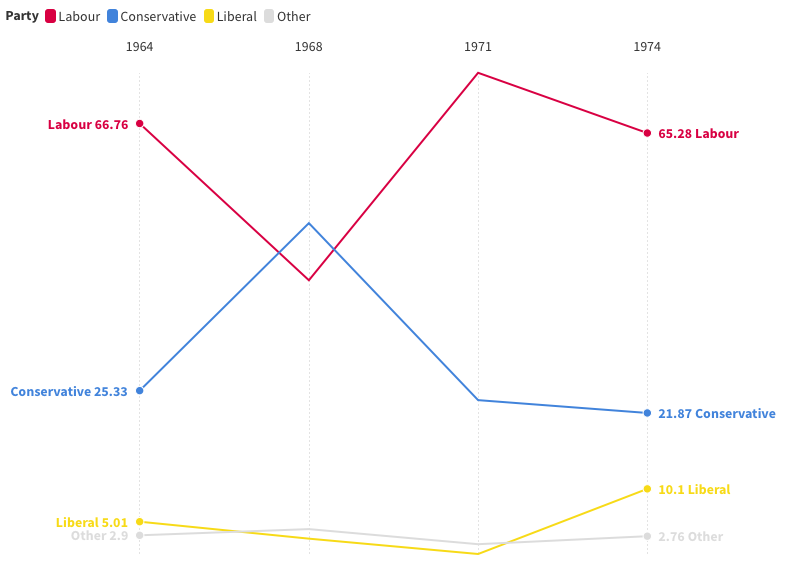
Southwark Council voting history

== Ward results ==
=== Abbey ===
Abbey (2)
Party	Candidate	Votes	%	±%
Labour	J. Dower*	1,455	85.6	▼0.2
Labour	C.J. Coveney*	1,451	85.4	▼0.6
Conservative	C.M. Wilson	118	6.9	▼4.0
Liberal	G.B. Lee	92	5.4	New
Liberal	T.J. Perrin	86	5.1	New
Turnout		1,700	26.4	−8.4
Labour hold		Swing		
Labour hold		Swing		

=== Alleyn ===
Alleyn (2)
Party	Candidate	Votes	%	±%
Labour	Mrs A.S. Ward*	1,042	50.3	▼10.8
Labour	E.A. Davies	1,037	50.0	▼13.3
Liberal	C.M. Hall	490	23.6	New
Liberal	J.F. Hayes	462	22.3	New
Conservative	D.M. Lang	452	21.8	▼13.2
Conservative	Miss S.E. Norman	449	21.7	▼12.7
Turnout		2,073	33.4	−3.2
Labour hold		Swing		
Labour hold		Swing		

=== Bellenden ===
Bellenden (3)
Party	Candidate	Votes	%	±%
Labour	F.E. Lee*	1,381	50.4	▼9.8
Labour	Mrs F.E. Sampson	1,378	50.3	▼10.2
Labour	Mrs J. Lee	1,369	50.0	▼8.4
Conservative	B.C. Leach	756	27.6	▼7.1
Conservative	R.P. Primmer	741	27.1	▼6.2
Conservative	G. Scott	685	25.0	▼8.3
Liberal	Mrs J.C. Haken	498	18.2	New
Liberal	A.J. Baker	468	17.1	New
Communist	E.L. Hodson	119	4.3	▼0.4
Turnout		2,739	29.4	−4.6
Labour hold		Swing		
Labour hold		Swing		
Labour hold		Swing		

=== Bricklayers ===
Bricklayers (2)
Party	Candidate	Votes	%	±%
Labour	L.A.J. Henley*	934	83.5	▲21.3
Labour	Mrs F. Whitnall*	900	80.5	▲20.6
Conservative	C.C. Hayward	150	13.4	▼12.6
Conservative	F.H. Morgan	144	12.9	▼13.0
Turnout		1,118	21.9	−6.2
Labour hold		Swing		
Labour hold		Swing		
Labour hold		Swing		

=== Browning ===
Browning (3)
Party	Candidate	Votes	%	±%
Labour	J.S. Lees*	1,134	60.2	▼21.3
Labour	P.E. McSorley	1,101	58.5	▼24.7
Labour	Rev J.W. Watson*	1,090	57.9	▼24.0
Independent Ratepayers	L.G. Howe	445	23.6	New
Independent Ratepayers	T.W. Elliott	434	23.0	New
Independent Ratepayers	W.C. Burnett	423	22.5	New
Conservative	D. Walker	231	12.3	▲0.2
Conservative	K. Walmsley	201	10.7	▼0.3
Liberal	Mrs A.L. Pelling	101	5.4	New
Turnout		1,883	27.8	+0.8
Labour hold		Swing		
Labour hold		Swing		
Labour hold		Swing		

=== Brunswick ===
Brunswick (3)
Party	Candidate	Votes	%	±%
Labour	Miss A.G. Liddle*	1,421	72.0	▼10.2
Labour	E.W.T. Pruce*	1,394	70.6	▼12.1
Labour	R. Watts*	1,361	68.9	▼12.8
Liberal	D.R. Howard	269	13.6	New
Liberal	Mrs V.A. Hunt	240	12.2	New
Conservative	F.N. Richardson	237	12.0	▼0.1
Liberal	M.S. Stokes	232	11.8	New
Conservative	R.S. Higgins	225	11.4	▼0.5
Turnout		1,974	23.4	−4.5
Labour hold		Swing		
Labour hold		Swing		
Labour hold		Swing		

=== Burgess ===
Burgess (3)
Party	Candidate	Votes	%	±%
Labour	J.H.K. Fowler*	1,388	78.1	▼5.2
Labour	N.B. Parry Jones	1,284	72.2	▼11.9
Labour	A.E. Wright	1,257	70.7	▼12.0
Conservative	G.D. Bailey	189	10.6	▼0.2
Conservative	C.V. Brewster	182	10.2	New
Liberal	Mrs K.C. Frith	141	7.9	New
Liberal	P.J.M. Glencross	127	7.1	New
Liberal	D.F. O'Byrne	108	6.1	New
Turnout		1,778	20.1	−5.0
Labour hold		Swing		
Labour hold		Swing		
Labour hold		Swing		

=== Cathedral ===
Cathedral (3)
Party	Candidate	Votes	%	±%
Labour	C.C Gates*	1,139	79.1	▼6.5
Labour	J.J. Lauder	1,116	77.5	▼2.8
Labour	D.D. McCoid*	1,034	71.8	▼11.2
Conservative	A.R. Nuttall	185	12.8	▼3.9
Independent	P. Chancellor	135	9.4	New
Turnout		1,440	19.2	±0.0
Labour hold		Swing		
Labour hold		Swing		
Labour hold		Swing		

=== Chaucer ===
Chaucer (3)
Party	Candidate	Votes	%	±%
Labour	A.E. Knight*	1,401	75.9	▼4.1
Labour	Mrs M.G. Farrow*	1,367	74.1	▼5.4
Labour	N.H. Tertis*	1,287	69.7	▼8.0
Conservative	Mrs K. Field	319	17.3	▲0.1
Conservative	Miss B.E. North	319	17.3	▼0.3
Conservative	Miss D.N. Parsons	300	16.3	▼0.9
Communist	M.J. Chislett	101	5.5	New
Turnout		1,846	23.5	−6.2
Labour hold		Swing		
Labour hold		Swing		
Labour hold		Swing		

=== College ===
College (2)
Party	Candidate	Votes	%	±%
Conservative	B.G.J. Hoskins	1,769	45.9	▼2.9
Conservative	N.J.D. Smith	1,744	45.2	▼2.2
Labour	W.G. Symes*	1,589	41.2	▼8.7
Labour	Mrs E.A. Ackroyd*	1,565	40.6	▼10.3
Liberal	M.B. Cogan	442	11.5	New
Liberal	Mrs M. Irving	433	11.2	New
Turnout		3,858	46.8	±0.0
Conservative gain from Labour		Swing		
Conservative gain from Labour		Swing		

=== Consort ===
Consort (2)
Party	Candidate	Votes	%	±%
Labour	W.F. Jones*	761	72.4	▼14.4
Labour	F.J. Francis	756	71.9	▼11.6
Conservative	Miss J. Holland	152	14.5	▲3.7
Conservative	Mrs F.G. Percival	126	12.0	▲0.2
Liberal	Miss P. Beale	97	9.2	New
Liberal	Mrs D.M. O'Byrne	94	8.9	New
Turnout		1,051	22.4	−4.6
Labour hold		Swing		
Labour hold		Swing		

=== Dockyard ===
Dockyard (2)
Party	Candidate	Votes	%	±%
Labour	Mrs L.M. Brown*	1,624	82.6	▼7.3
Labour	John H. O'Grady*	1,512	76.9	▼10.9
Conservative	P. Gray	223	11.3	▲2.8
National Front	D.M. Thompson	100	5.1	New
National Front	A.H. Whitmore	80	4.1	New
Turnout		1.966	25.9	−9.1
Labour hold		Swing		
Labour hold		Swing		

=== Faraday ===
Faraday (4)
Party	Candidate	Votes	%	±%
Labour	F.W. Combes*	2,415	80.4	▼4.8
Labour	W.A. Slater	2,384	79.4	▼5.1
Labour	Mrs A.E. Waller*	2,369	78.9	▼3.8
Labour	Mrs A. McNaught	2,368	78.9	▼5.2
Conservative	J. McKay	287	9.6	▲0.2
Conservative	C.C. Keene	280	9.3	▲0.1
Liberal	R. Barker	216	7.2	New
Liberal	B.S. Jenkins	214	7.1	New
Liberal	Mrs V.E. Howard	213	7.1	New
Liberal	M.C. West	169	5.6	New
Turnout		3,002	21.0	−5.9
Labour hold		Swing		
Labour hold		Swing		
Labour hold		Swing		
Labour hold		Swing		

=== Friary ===
Friary (3)
Party	Candidate	Votes	%	±%
Labour	F.A. Goldwin*	1,480	76.1	▼10.8
Labour	Mrs M.V. Goldwin*	1,443	74.2	▼14.0
Labour	Miss J.M. Somerville	1,387	71.3	▼15.8
Conservative	Mrs G. Cobley	221	11.4	▲3.5
Conservative	E.L. Keetch	207	10.6	▲1.8
Conservative	J.R. Mills	197	10.1	▲2.7
Liberal	W.H. Hartin	155	8.0	New
Liberal	H.W.F. Moore	127	6.5	New
Turnout		1,945	21.6	−4.2
Labour hold		Swing		
Labour hold		Swing		
Labour hold		Swing		

=== Lyndhurst ===
Lyndhurst (3)
Party	Candidate	Votes	%	±%
Labour	W.H. Payne*	2,103	63.3	▼6.2
Labour	D.J. Whiting*	1,947	58.6	▼8.4
Labour	H.C. Potter*	1,848	55.6	▼13.4
Conservative	Mrs P.C. Cooper	787	23.7	▼4.9
Conservative	R. Spilberg	766	23.1	▼4.2
Conservative	I.M. Andrews	763	23.0	▼5.2
Liberal	A.W. Porter	453	13.6	New
Liberal	Mrs A. Bostock	307	9.2	New
Liberal	D.M. Phillips	299	9.0	New
Communist	Miss C. Mayow	144	4.3	New
Turnout		3,321	31.6	−7.6
Labour hold		Swing		
Labour hold		Swing		
Labour hold		Swing		

=== Newington ===
Newington (3)
Party	Candidate	Votes	%	±%
Labour	Mrs C.M. Clunn*	1,334	63.4	▼14.7
Labour	C.A.G. Halford*	1,312	62.4	▼17.8
Labour	S.W. Cox	1,299	61.7	▼17.2
Liberal	N.J.S. Clemens	477	22.7	New
Liberal	Mrs G.I. Clemens	438	20.8	New
Liberal	Mrs D.M.I. Jenkins	416	19.8	New
Conservative	T.W.H. Eckersley	212	10.1	▼6.4
Conservative	J.A. Villers	190	9.0	▼6.4
Turnout		2,104	23.9	−1.8
Labour hold		Swing		
Labour hold		Swing		
Labour hold		Swing		

=== Riverside ===
Riverside (2)
Party	Candidate	Votes	%	±%
Labour	Mrs A. Stevens*	1,550	77.5	▼7.1
Labour	L.T. Tucker*	1,482	74.1	▼10.3
Liberal	T.J. Taylor	240	12.0	New
Conservative	A.J. Padmore	234	11.7	▼1.5
Liberal	R.G. Tindall	149	7.4	New
Turnout		2,001	28.2	−6.5
Labour hold		Swing		
Labour hold		Swing		

=== Rotherhithe ===
Rotherhithe (2)
Party	Candidate	Votes	%	±%
Labour	E.A. Rowe*	1,317	89.3	▼0.9
Labour	H.W.G. Young*	1,196	81.1	▼4.6
Conservative	B.D. Thurnell	128	8.7	▼0.6
Turnout		1,475	21.8	−6.7
Labour hold		Swing		
Labour hold		Swing		

=== Ruskin ===
Ruskin (2)
Party	Candidate	Votes	%	±%
Conservative	Mrs H.E. Day*	1,776	52.0	▼8.8
Conservative	R.J. Dunn	1,759	51.5	▼8.8
Labour	R.W. Postlethwaite	972	28.5	▼10.1
Labour	R.W. Eadie	969	28.4	▼9.7
Liberal	J.A. Salisbury-Jones	598	17.5	New
Liberal	Mrs E. Boumphrey	583	17.1	New
Turnout		3,413	48.1	+5.7
Conservative hold		Swing		
Conservative hold		Swing		

=== Rye ===
Rye (2)
Party	Candidate	Votes	%	±%
Labour	C.J. Rouse	1,301	43.2	▼6.9
Labour	Mrs A. Brereton*	1,298	43.1	▼7.1
Conservative	N.R. Robinson	1,148	38.1	▼10.3
Conservative	T.J. Smith	1,133	37.6	▼9.3
Liberal	J.C. Barley	283	9.4	New
Liberal	P.T. Snasdell	265	8.8	New
National Front	R.A.W. Jackson	212	7.0	New
National Front	D.B. Webber	196	6.5	New
Turnout		3,014	40.5	+1.0
Labour hold		Swing		
Labour hold		Swing		

=== St Giles ===
St Giles (3)
Party	Candidate	Votes	%	±%
Labour	Mrs E.M. Dalton*	1,318	65.8	▼11.3
Labour	L.H. Alden*	1,282	64.0	▼13.1
Labour	R. Wedlake*	1,244	62.1	▼12.1
Conservative	J. Kilbane	328	16.4	▲0.7
Conservative	Miss M. McKeown	328	16.4	▲4.1
Conservative	M.P. Mulligan	317	15.8	▲2.0
Liberal	R.B.G. Thompson	277	13.8	New
Liberal	J.N. Hunt	268	13.4	New
Liberal	D. Main	254	12.7	New
Turnout		2,002	22.3	−1.7
Labour hold		Swing		
Labour hold		Swing		
Labour hold		Swing		

=== The Lane ===
The Lane (3)
Party	Candidate	Votes	%	±%
Labour	G.W. Byfield*	1,958	69.5	▼4.5
Labour	F.J. Brean*	1,948	69.1	▼6.4
Labour	P. Cather*	1,905	67.6	▼5.6
Labour	F.T. Rolfe*	1,837	65.2	▼5.5
Conservative	Mrs J.R. Bryant	581	20.6	▼7.4
Conservative	J.W. Kennedy	411	14.6	▼5.1
Conservative	S.H. Smith	383	13.6	▼5.3
Conservative	J.N. Uphill	357	12.7	▼6.1
Liberal	Mrs R.E. Cogan	232	8.2	New
Liberal	Miss A.P. Lambert	221	7.8	New
Liberal	Mrs F.N. Kapadia	194	6.9	New
Liberal	D.A. Teale	194	6.9	New
Communist	I.P. Findlay	108	3.8	New
Turnout		2,818	23.0	−6.9
Labour hold		Swing		
Labour hold		Swing		
Labour hold		Swing		
Labour hold		Swing		

=== Waverley ===
Waverley (2)
Party	Candidate	Votes	%	±%
Labour	H.T. Ball*	1,354	69.2	▼1.7
Labour	M.J. Dalton	1,280	65.4	▼4.2
Conservative	R. Goose	412	21.1	▼7.1
Conservative	Mrs A.M. Wallace	387	19.8	▼7.0
Liberal	Mrs L.M. Hobbs	181	9.3	New
Liberal	S. Maharasingam	135	6.9	New
Turnout		1,956	31.7	−5.9
Labour hold		Swing		
Labour hold		Swing		

== By-Elections ==
Cathedral by-election, 24 April 1975
Party	Candidate	Votes	%	±%
Labour	Stephen J. Kippin	633	69.8	▼2.0
Conservative	Alfred R. Nuttall	136	15.0	▲2.2
National Front	Kevin McDonagh	80	8.8	New
Liberal	Thomas J. Taylor	58	6.4	New
Turnout			12.7	−6.5
Labour hold		Swing		

Brunswick by-election, 25 March 1976
Party	Candidate	Votes	%	±%
Labour	Jeremy Gordon	885	49.1	▼21.5
Conservative	Tobias W. H. Eckersley	446	24.7	▲12.7
National Party	Ronald A. Jackson	252	14.0	New
Liberal	Veronica Hunt	220	12.2	Steady
Turnout			22.6	−0.8
Labour hold		Swing		

Burgess by-election, 20 January 1977
Party	Candidate	Votes	%	±%
Labour	Michael Geater	530	37.9	▼32.8
Conservative	Tobias W. H. Eckersley	478	34.2	▲23.6
National Party	Ronald A. Jackson	390	27.9	New
Turnout			16.0	−4.1
Labour hold		Swing		

Ruskin by-election, 29 September 1977
Party	Candidate	Votes	%	±%
Conservative	Tobias W. H. Eckersley	1,580	59.1	▲7.1
Labour	Carol Turner	622	23.3	▼5.2
Liberal	Brian K. Seeley	243	9.1	▼8.4
National Front	James S. Sneath	228	8.5	New
Turnout			38.7	−9.4
Conservative hold		Swing		
