= 1978 Southwark London Borough Council election =

1978 local election in England

1978 Southwark Council election
- 4 May 1978

All council seats
	First party	Second party
Party	Labour	Conservative
Seats won	56	8
Seat change	▼10	▲4
Popular vote	29,551	18,450
Percentage	57.88%	36.13%
Swing	▼7.4%	▲14.26%
Council Control before election
Labour
Council Control
Labour

Elections to Southwark Council were held in May 1978. The whole council was up for election with a 28.7% turnout. There were 25 wards rather than the previous 23 and 64 councillors rather than 70.

== Election result ==

Southwark local election result 1978
Party	Seats	Gains	Losses	Net gain/loss	Seats %	Votes %	Votes	+/−
Labour	56			▼10	87.5	57.88	29,551	▼7.4
Conservative	8			▲4	12.5	36.13	18,450	▲14.26
Liberal	0			0	0.0	3.81	1,943	▼6.29
National Front	0			0	0.0	1.3	663	▲0.69
Communist	0			0	0.0	0.78	399	▼0.19
Workers Revolutionary	0			0	0.0	0.1	53	New

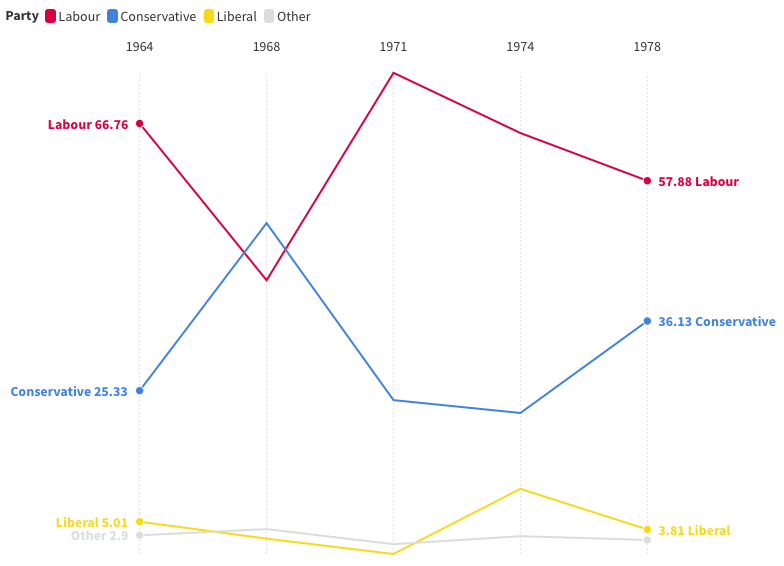
Southwark Council voting history

== Ward results ==
=== Abbey ===
Abbey (2)
Party	Candidate	Votes	%	±%
Labour	Charles Coveney*	1,076	70.8	
Labour	James Dower*	1,026	67.5	
Conservative	Peter Crockford	346	22.8	
Conservative	John Heywood	304	20.0	
Workers Revolutionary	Anthony Moore	53	3.5	
Turnout		1,520	29.2	
Labour win (new seat)				
Labour win (new seat)				

=== Alleyn ===
Alleyn (2)
Party	Candidate	Votes	%	±%
Labour	Robert Eadie	900	41.4	
Conservative	Catherine Clough	860	39.6	
Conservative	Alan Robson	811	37.3	
Labour	Madan Kalia	736	33.9	
Liberal	Jean Halden	303	13.9	
Liberal	Ronald Halden	286	13.2	
Turnout		2,174	37.7	
Labour win (new seat)				
Conservative win (new seat)				

=== Barset ===
Barset (2)
Party	Candidate	Votes	%	±%
Labour	Anthony Ritchie	665	56.2	
Labour	Peter Cather*	651	55.0	
Conservative	Andrew Davies	350	29.6	
Conservative	Peter Hogarth	334	28.2	
Liberal	Susan Clegg	66	5.6	
Liberal	Anne Chopping	63	5.3	
Turnout		1,184	27.6	
Labour win (new seat)				
Labour win (new seat)				

=== Bellenden ===
Bellenden (3)
Party	Candidate	Votes	%	±%
Labour	Douglas Moore	1,500	47.0	
Labour	Ann Ward*	1,470	46.1	
Labour	Florence Sampson*	1,334	41.8	
Conservative	Edward Boxall	1,170	36.7	
Conservative	Robert Primmer	1,113	34.9	
Conservative	Muriel Piper	1,107	34.7	
Liberal	Alexander Baker	253	7.9	
Liberal	Mary Packman	245	7.7	
Liberal	Margaret White	233	7.3	
Communist	Eric Hodson	115	3.6	
Turnout		3,191	36.1	
Labour win (new seat)				
Labour win (new seat)				
Labour win (new seat)				

=== Bricklayers ===
Bricklayers (2)
Party	Candidate	Votes	%	±%
Labour	Leonard Henley*	1,111	69.1	
Labour	Leonard Tucker*	1,024	63.7	
Conservative	Charles Hayward	417	25.9	
Conservative	Frederick Morgan	399	24.8	
Turnout		1,607	28.4	
Labour win (new seat)				
Labour win (new seat)				

=== Browning ===
Browning (3)
Party	Candidate	Votes	%	±%
Labour	Joseph Lees*	1,201	61.2	
Labour	Patrick McSorley*	1,191	60.7	
Labour	Frances Stroud	1,168	59.5	
Conservative	Timothy Webster	559	28.5	
Conservative	Peter Hensman	530	27.0	
Conservative	John Erbetta	495	25.2	
Turnout		1,962	25.7	
Labour win (new seat)				
Labour win (new seat)				
Labour win (new seat)				

=== Brunswick ===
Brunswick (3)
Party	Candidate	Votes	%	±%
Labour	Jeremy Gordon	1,335	59.1	
Labour	Ronald Watts*	1,233	54.6	
Labour	John Lauder*	1,232	54.6	
Conservative	Lilian Dawson	594	26.3	
Conservative	Mary Ancient	568	25.2	
Conservative	Douglas Mitchell	555	24.6	
National Front	David Thompson	205	9.1	
National Front	John Mullens	199	8.8	
National Front	Stephen Wisdom	166	7.4	
Turnout		2,257	28.6	
Labour win (new seat)				
Labour win (new seat)				
Labour win (new seat)				

=== Burgess ===
Burgess (2)
Party	Candidate	Votes	%	±%
Labour	Ronald Slater	925	62.0	
Labour	Trevor Ely	921	61.7	
Conservative	Albert Rumble	434	29.1	
Conservative	Clayton Wintrip	398	26.7	
Turnout		1,492	26.3	
Labour win (new seat)				
Labour win (new seat)				

=== Cathedral ===
Cathedral (2)
Party	Candidate	Votes	%	±%
Labour	George Nicholson	1,035	69.0	
Labour	Alan Davis	964	64.2	
Conservative	Alfred Nuttall	387	25.8	
Conservative	Desmond McCann	361	24.1	
Turnout		1,501	27.2	
Labour win (new seat)				
Labour win (new seat)				

=== Chaucer ===
Chaucer (3)
Party	Candidate	Votes	%	±%
Labour	Arthur Knight*	1,420	61.9	
Labour	Joy Lee*	1,325	57.8	
Labour	Bert Ray	1,305	56.9	
Conservative	Beatrice North	689	30.0	
Conservative	Patrick Stewart	645	28.1	
Conservative	David Walker	615	26.8	
Turnout		2,294	28.2	
Labour win (new seat)				
Labour win (new seat)				
Labour win (new seat)				

=== College ===
College (2)
Party	Candidate	Votes	%	±%
Conservative	Bryan Hoskings*	1,858	55.8	
Conservative	Margaret Jackson	1,758	52.8	
Labour	Peter Bowyer	1,216	36.5	
Labour	Eric Senger	1,102	33.1	
Liberal	Malcolm Cogan	208	6.3	
Liberal	Mimi Irving	190	5.7	
Turnout		3,327	51.6	
Conservative win (new seat)				
Conservative win (new seat)				

=== Consort ===
Consort (2)
Party	Candidate	Votes	%	±%
Labour	Robert Smyth	794	59.9	
Labour	Frederick Francis*	777	58.6	
Conservative	Johanna Holland	423	31.9	
Conservative	James Uphill	344	26.0	
Turnout		1,325	30.8	
Labour win (new seat)				
Labour win (new seat)				

=== Dockyard ===
Dockyard (3)
Party	Candidate	Votes	%	±%
Labour	Lucy Brown*	1,468	71.3	
Labour	John O'Grady*	1,454	70.6	
Labour	Stephen Kippin	1,441	70.0	
Conservative	Percy Gray	383	18.6	
Conservative	Kenneth Cook	322	15.6	
Conservative	David Egan	308	15.0	
Communist	Elizabeth Wright	158	7.7	
Turnout		2,060	28.8	
Labour win (new seat)				
Labour win (new seat)				
Labour win (new seat)				

=== Faraday ===
Faraday (3)
Party	Candidate	Votes	%	±%
Labour	Frederick Combes*	1,505	64.3	
Labour	James Greening	1,484	63.4	
Labour	William Slater*	1,454	62.1	
Conservative	Gladys Cobley	649	27.7	
Conservative	Basil Leach	591	25.2	
Conservative	Francis Richardson	572	24.4	
Turnout		2,341	23.1	
Labour win (new seat)				
Labour win (new seat)				
Labour win (new seat)				

=== Friary ===
Friary (3)
Party	Candidate	Votes	%	±%
Labour	Mabel Goldwin*	953	59.4	
Labour	Walter Allen	913	56.9	
Labour	Joyce Somerville*	873	54.4	
Conservative	Leslie Brown	402	25.1	
Conservative	Evannie Smith	356	22.2	
Conservative	George Noorden	343	21.4	
National Front	Joseph Richardson	134	8.4	
National Front	James Sneath	126	7.9	
Turnout		1,604	27.0	
Labour win (new seat)				
Labour win (new seat)				
Labour win (new seat)				

=== Liddle ===
Liddle (3)
Party	Candidate	Votes	%	±%
Labour	John Fowler*	1,357	66.5	
Labour	Anne McNaught*	1,326	65.0	
Labour	Michael Geater	1,316	64.5	
Conservative	Ernest Keetch	317	15.5	
Conservative	Joan Southgate	245	12.0	
Conservative	Paul Watkinson	227	11.1	
National Front	George Thompson	185	9.1	
National Front	Peter Williams	179	8.8	
Turnout		2,040	25.1	
Labour win (new seat)				
Labour win (new seat)				
Labour win (new seat)				

=== Lyndhurst ===
Lyndhurst (3)
Party	Candidate	Votes	%	±%
Labour	William Payne*	1,804	47.8	
Labour	Ernest Davies*	1,789	47.4	
Labour	Evelyn Ackroyd	1,777	47.0	
Conservative	Michael Frost	1,454	38.5	
Conservative	Richard Clough	1,430	37.9	
Conservative	Ashwinkumar Tanna	1,353	35.8	
Liberal	Phillipa Beale	254	6.7	
Liberal	Jonathan Hunt	254	6.7	
Liberal	Michael Wilson	210	5.6	
Communist	Linda Smith	95	2.5	
Turnout		3,778	40.1	
Labour win (new seat)				
Labour win (new seat)				
Labour win (new seat)				

=== Newington ===
Newington (3)
Party	Candidate	Votes	%	±%
Labour	Siah Cox*	1,405	60.7	
Labour	Charles Halford*	1,375	59.4	
Labour	Catherine Clunn*	1,365	59.0	
Conservative	Gerard Fergus	751	32.5	
Conservative	Carole Hurst	679	29.4	
Conservative	Anne-Louise Kearney	679	29.4	
Turnout		2,313	27.9	
Labour win (new seat)				
Labour win (new seat)				
Labour win (new seat)				

=== Riverside ===
Riverside (3)
Party	Candidate	Votes	%	±%
Labour	Thomas Cornish	1,672	71.4	
Labour	Peter Flower	1,623	69.3	
Labour	Coral Newell	1,537	65.7	
Conservative	Alexander Padmore	477	20.4	
Conservative	Linda Albon	472	20.2	
Conservative	David Griffin	402	17.2	
Turnout		2,341	36.1	
Labour win (new seat)				
Labour win (new seat)				
Labour win (new seat)				

=== Rotherhithe ===
Rotherhithe (3)
Party	Candidate	Votes	%	±%
Labour	Edward Rowe*	1,206	70.4	
Labour	Charles Sawyer	1,181	68.9	
Labour	Harold Young*	1,163	67.9	
Conservative	Lorna Dowling	373	21.8	
Conservative	Robert Dunn*	317	18.5	
Conservative	Geoffrey Johnson	313	18.3	
Turnout		1,714	24.7	
Labour win (new seat)				
Labour win (new seat)				
Labour win (new seat)				

=== Ruskin ===
Ruskin (3)
Party	Candidate	Votes	%	±%
Conservative	John Meakin	2,552	62.5	
Conservative	Ralph Spilberg	2,549	62.4	
Conservative	Tobias Eckersley	2,544	62.3	
Labour	Joseph Essex	1,017	24.9	
Labour	Claude Ramsey	924	22.6	
Labour	Charles Gates*	917	22.4	
Liberal	Brian Feeley	365	8.9	
Liberal	John Graham	356	8.7	
Liberal	Hazel Feeley	346	8.5	
Turnout		4,086	46.6	
Conservative win (new seat)				
Conservative win (new seat)				
Conservative win (new seat)				

=== Rye ===
Rye (2)
Party	Candidate	Votes	%	±%
Conservative	Enid Boxall	1,553	49.2	
Conservative	Ralph Spilberg	1,487	47.1	
Labour	Herbert Ball*	1,190	37.7	
Labour	Geoffrey Cravitz	1,180	37.4	
Liberal	Marian Atkinson	194	6.1	
Liberal	Robert Stead	186	5.9	
Turnout		3,158	43.5	
Conservative win (new seat)				
Conservative win (new seat)				

=== St Giles ===
St Giles (3)
Party	Candidate	Votes	%	±%
Labour	David Mitchels	1,494	57.7	
Labour	Leslie Alden*	1,481	57.2	
Labour	Henry Potter*	1,473	56.9	
Conservative	Christopher Clark	787	30.4	
Conservative	George Scott	701	27.1	
Conservative	Peter Houston	696	26.9	
Liberal	Janice Wilson	143	5.5	
Liberal	Veronica Hunt	130	5.0	
Liberal	Bernard Jenkins	128	4.9	
Turnout		2,589	29.0	
Labour win (new seat)				
Labour win (new seat)				
Labour win (new seat)				

=== The Lane ===
The Lane (2)
Party	Candidate	Votes	%	±%
Labour	Frank Brean*	1,002	57.6	
Labour	Frank Rolfe*	905	52.0	
Conservative	Anthony Elleray	438	25.2	
Conservative	Terence Bray-Deacon	408	23.5	
National Front	Leonard Rickard	161	9.3	
Liberal	Ann Bostock	94	5.4	
Liberal	Daniel Tierney	78	4.5	
Communist	George Rogers	31	1.8	
Turnout		1,739	32.6	
Labour win (new seat)				
Labour win (new seat)				

=== Waverley ===
Waverley (2)
Party	Candidate	Votes	%	±%
Labour	James Wheeler	1,127	45.9	
Labour	Carol Turner	1,126	45.9	
Conservative	Alan Smith	994	40.5	
Conservative	David Haines	980	40.0	
Liberal	Alan Clegg	135	5.5	
Liberal	Edwin Bonner	134	5.5	
Turnout		2,453	41.1	
Labour win (new seat)				
Labour win (new seat)				

== By-Elections ==
Newington by-election, 21 September 1978
Party	Candidate	Votes	%	±%
Labour	Solomon Parry	781	45.0	−15.7
Conservative	Gerard Fergus	698	40.2	+7.7
National Front	David Teanby	168	9.7	N/A
Liberal	Veronica Hunt	90	5.2	N/A
Turnout			21.2	−6.7
Labour hold		Swing		

The by-election was called following the death of Cllr. Siah Cox

Riverside by-election, 30 November 1978
Party	Candidate	Votes	%	±%
Labour	Margaret White	775	68.2	−1.1
Conservative	Alexander Padmore	274	24.1	+3.7
National Front	Leonard Richard	87	7.7	N/A
Turnout			17.2	−18.9
Labour hold		Swing		

The by-election was called following the death of Cllr. Peter Flower

Rye by-election, 20 March 1980
Party	Candidate	Votes	%	±%
Labour	Pauline Moore	1,331	47.8	+10.1
Conservative	Richard Clough	1,222	43.9	−5.3
Liberal	Marian Atkinson	230	8.3	+2.2
Turnout			40.4	−3.1
Labour gain from Conservative		Swing		

The by-election was called following the death of Cllr. Enid Boxall

The Lane by-election, 5 November 1981
Party	Candidate	Votes	%	±%
Alliance (SDP)	John Lewis	916	47.1	+41.7
Labour	Susan Goss	711	36.6	−21.0
Conservative	Ian Twinn	245	12.6	−12.6
National Front	David Teanby	71	3.7	−5.6
Turnout			33.4	+0.8
Alliance gain from Labour		Swing		

The by-election was called following the resignation of Cllr. Frank Brean
