= Mungo Murray =

Mungo Murray may refer to

- Mungo Murray (clergyman) (1599–1670), Scottish scholar and clergyman
- Mungo Murray (writer) (died 1770), British writer on shipbuilding
- Mungo Murray, 7th Earl of Mansfield (1900–1971), Scottish politician
- Sir Mungo Murray, 2nd Baronet (died c. 1670), see Murray baronets, of Clermont, Fife
- Sir Mungo Murray, 3rd Baronet (died c. 1700), see Murray baronets, of Clermont, Fife

== See also ==
- Mungo Murray Chisuse, 19th-century Nyasaland photographer
