= City Bridge Foundation =

UK charitable trust in London

Logo of City Bridge Foundation

City Bridge Foundation is the working name of the historic Bridge House Estates, which originated in the late eleventh century and was formally established by royal charter in 1282 by the City of London Corporation in London, England. It is a registered charity governed by a single trustee, the City of London Corporation, represented by the City Bridge Foundation Board.

== History ==
It was originally established to maintain London Bridge and, subsequently, other bridges. Funded by bridge tolls and charitable donations, the foundation acquired an extensive property portfolio which made it more than self-sufficient. As well as maintaining the bridges, the foundation also makes charitable grants. It is one of three trust funds managed by the City of London, the other two being the City Fund and the City's Cash.

Since it was established, the foundation has maintained, and on several occasions replaced, London Bridge. The foundation also built Blackfriars Bridge and Tower Bridge, and purchased Southwark Bridge from the toll-exacting private company that built it. Most recently it took over ownership and maintenance of the pedestrian-only Millennium Bridge, having provided a large amount of the funding for its construction. The estate owns significant amounts of property in the City of London.

Until 1995, the foundation was permitted to use its income only for expenditure on its bridges. However, with a surplus of income over expenditure, a cy-près scheme was adopted in that year to allow any surplus income to be used for other charitable purposes benefiting Greater London.

From 1995 to September 2023 the charity funding arm was known as City Bridge Trust. In September 2023 Bridge House Estates and the City Bridge Trust merged unifying the brand as the City Bridge Foundation, however the formal entity name is still the Bridge House Estates.

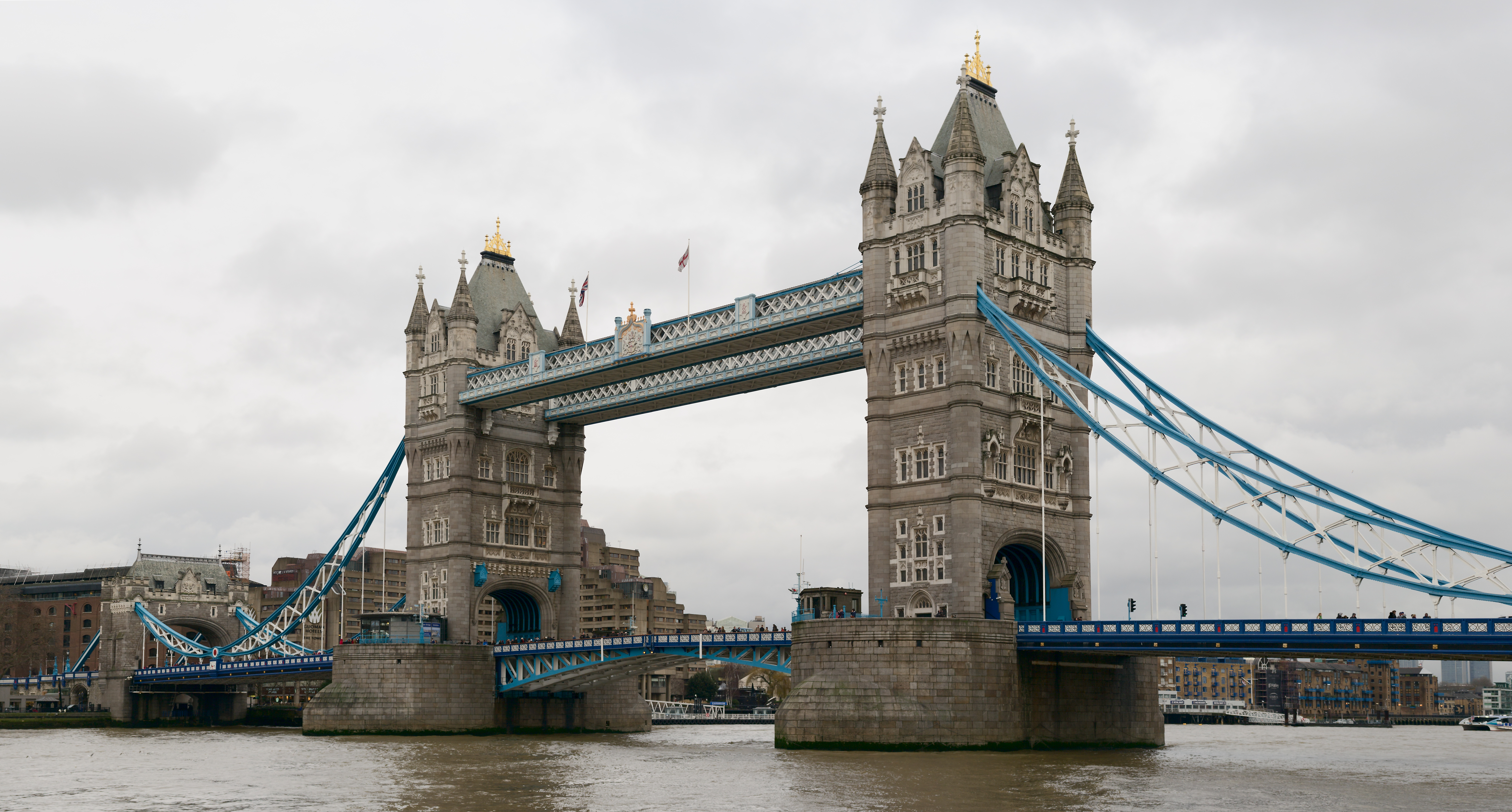
Tower Bridge

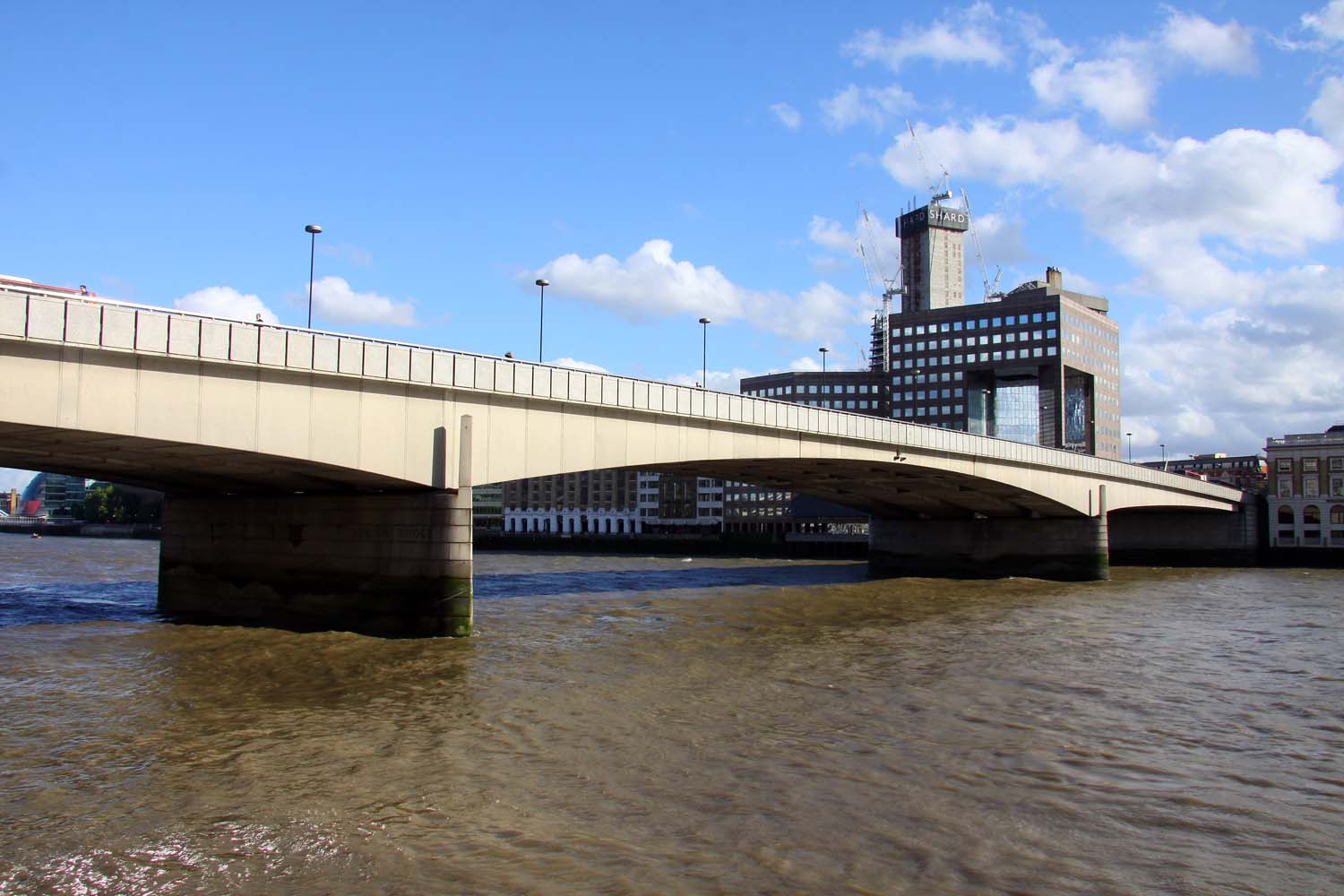
London Bridge

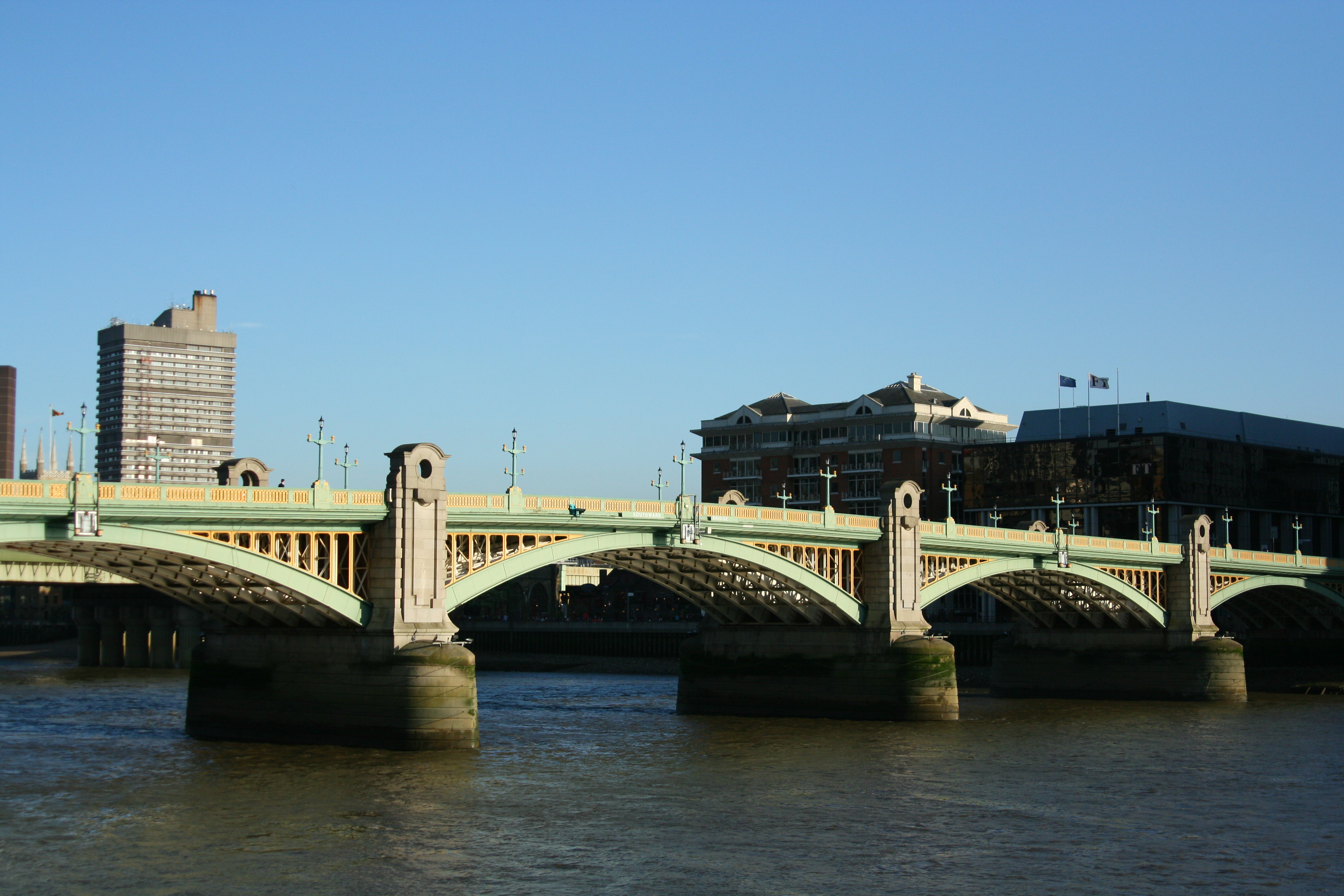
Southwark Bridge

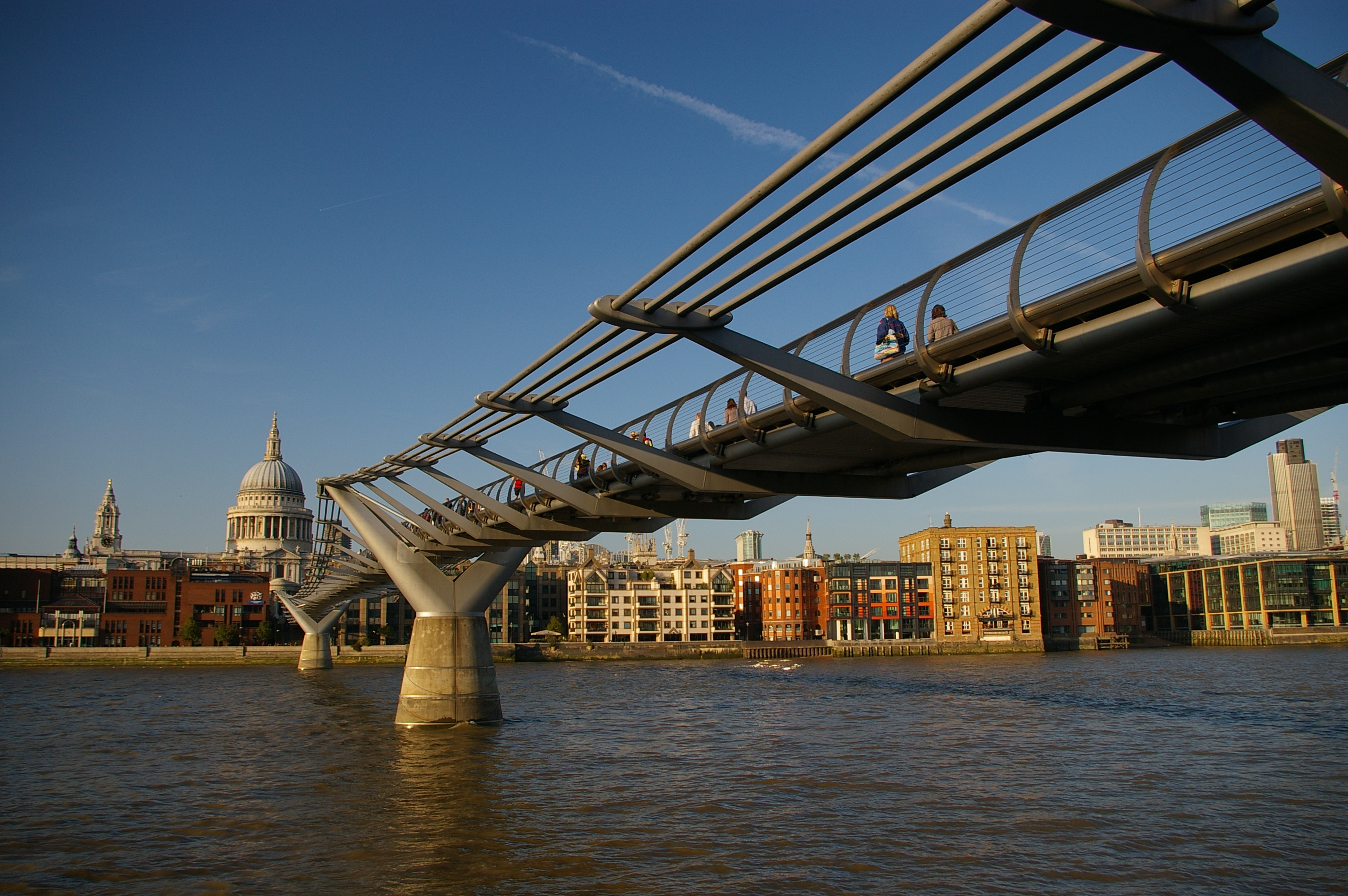
Millenium Bridge

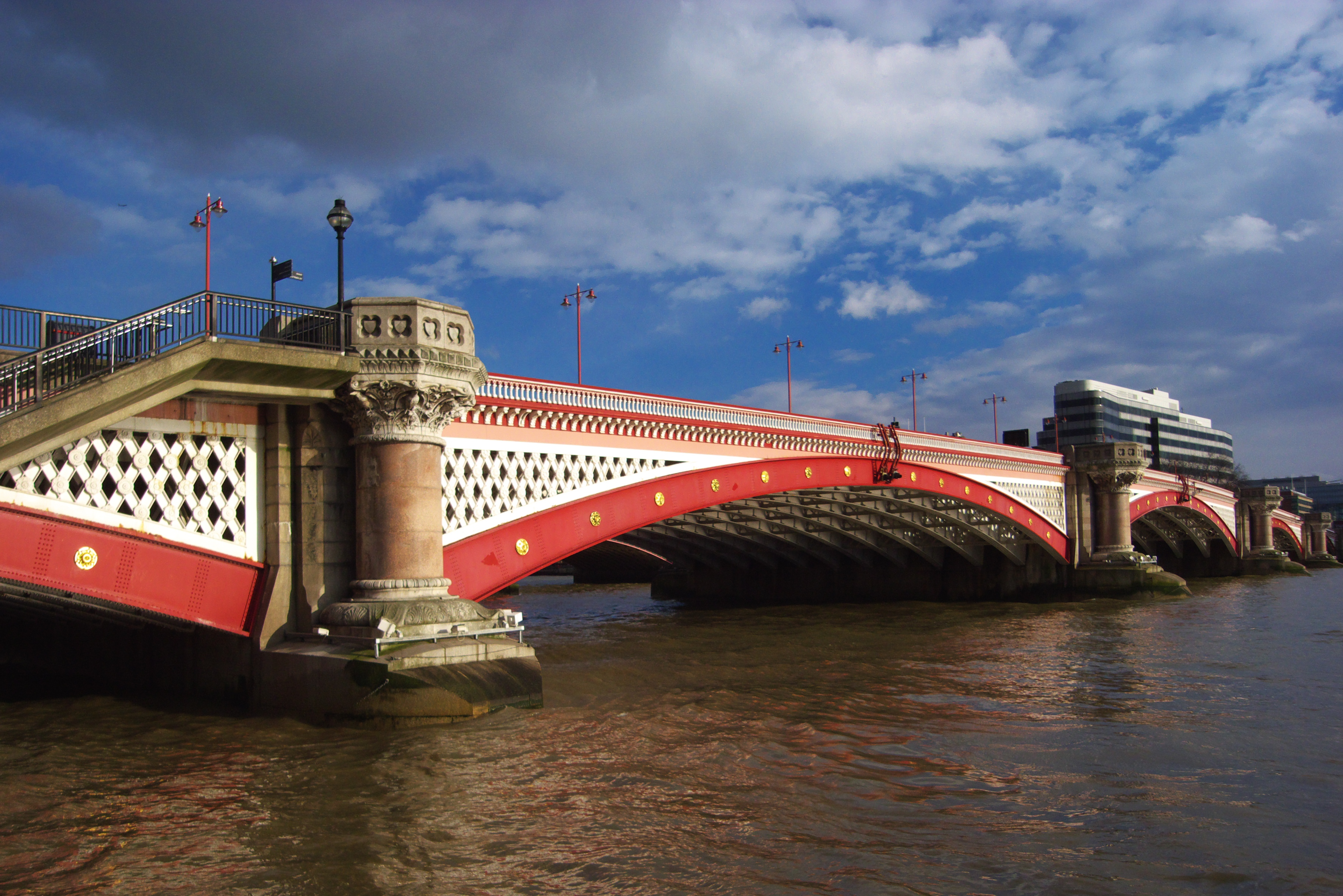
Blackfriars Bridge

== Bridge House ==
The Bridge House Estates took its name from Bridge House, which was the administrative and maintenance centre of Old London Bridge located on the south bank of the River Thames, near the site of St Olave's Church (since replaced by St Olaf House in Tooley Street). The site, now covered by the London Bridge Hospital and the Cotton's Centre, was constituted of at least two properties in Southwark. The first was that of Peter of Colechurch the warden of the bridge from 1163, and probably a monastic dwelling. The second property was the house left by the will of Henry fitz Ailwin, first named Mayor of London, in 1215.

The bridge became part of the City's jurisdiction from 1282, and this led to the City attempting to extend control over Southwark, succeeding in acquiring the 'vill of Southwark' alias the Guildable Manor in 1327.

== Logo ==
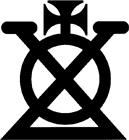
The bridge mark of Bridge House Estates

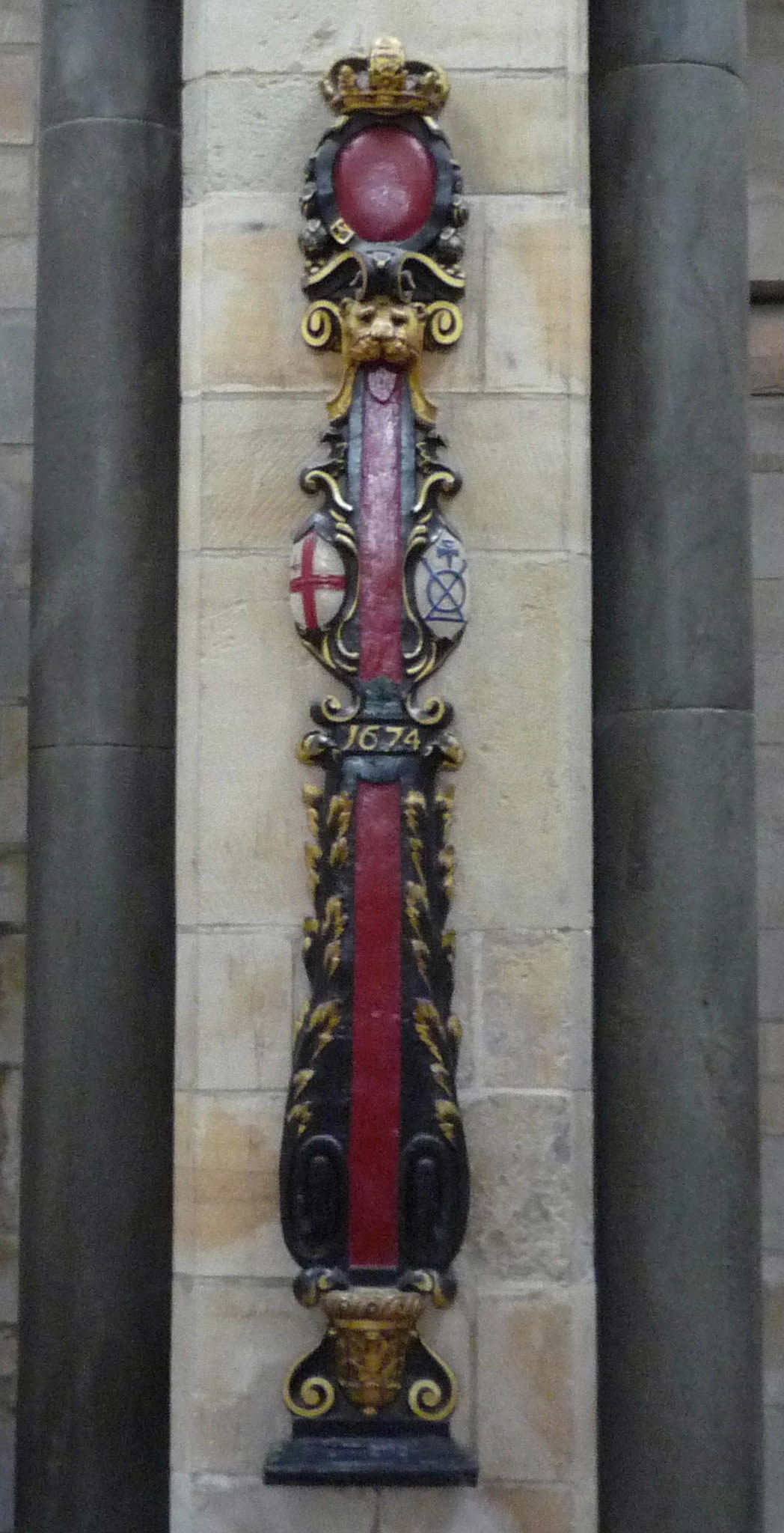
City sword rest, formerly in the church of St Olave Southwark, and now in Southwark Cathedral, showing the Bridge Mark

Known as the Bridge Mark, the logo of Bridge House Estates is one of the oldest logos in continuous use and can be found carved into stonework in many places along the riverfront. It has been the identifying emblem of the Bridge House Estates for many centuries, but the latter now uses the City of London arms as an emblem.

It was thought likely that the mark as we know it today was designed by a famous 17th-century surveyor, William Leybourn. It appears drawn on a plan of 1680 which it is thought he adapted from a similar mark drawn against plots owned by Bridge House Estates on an earlier plan of St George's Fields in Southwark. The City sword rest from the church of St Olave, Southwark (now in the north transept of Southwark Cathedral) has the Bridge Mark carved onto it to balance the City's shield, and shows a date of 1674.

== Governance ==
Blackfriars Bridge Act 1863
- Act of Parliament
- Parliament of the United Kingdom
- Long title: An Act to authorise the Mayor and Commonality and Citizens of the City of London to rebuild Blackfriars Bridge.
- Citation: 26 & 27 Vict. c. lxii

Dates
- Royal assent: 8 June 1863

Blackfriars and Southwark Bridge Act 1867
- Act of Parliament
- Parliament of the United Kingdom
- Long title: An Act to enable the Mayor and Commonality and Citizens of the City of London to borrow a further Sum of Money on the Security of the Bridge House Estates, to complete the rebuilding of Blackfriars Bridge, and for the Purchase of Southwark Bridge; and for other purposes.
- Citation: 30 & 31 Vict. c. iii

Dates
- Royal assent: 5 April 1867

Text of statute as originally enacted

Corporation of London (Tower Bridge) Act 1885
- Act of Parliament
- Parliament of the United Kingdom
- Long title: An Act to empower the Corporation of London to construct a Bridge over the River Thames near the Tower of London with approaches thereto and for other purposes.
- Citation: 48 & 49 Vict. c. cxcv

Dates
- Royal assent: 14 August 1885

Other legislation
- Amended by: Corporation of London (Tower Bridge) Act 1889; Corporation of London (Tower Bridge) Extension of Time Act 1893

The Bridge House Estates was established by the grant of a royal charter on 24 May 1282, and the sole trustee is the City of London Corporation. The trustee is the legal but not beneficial owner of the trust property—it may only be used for the legitimate purposes for which the fund was created.

Bridge House Estates are run by a committee of the City of London Corporation called the City Bridge Foundation Board (formerly the Bridge House Estates Board). Formed in 2021, the chairship is held by a Common Councillor on a four-year rotation; the first chair was Giles Shilson, who was in post until November 2024. The current Chair of the Board is Paul Martinelli.

In addition to its royal charter of 1282, the Bridge House Estates operates with respect to various legislative powers, e.g., the Blackfriars Bridge Act 1863 (26 & 27 Vict. c. lxii), the Blackfriars and Southwark Bridge Act 1867 (30 & 31 Vict. c. iii), the Corporation of London (Tower Bridge) Act 1885 (48 & 49 Vict. c. cxcv) for its maintenance role and for its general charitable role under the Charities (The Bridge House Estates) Order 1995 (SI 1995/1047), and the Charities (The Bridge House Estates) Order 2001 (SI 2001/4017).

== Finances ==
Originally funded by tolls on London Bridge, the rents and leases of the buildings that were on it and also by charitable donations, the Bridge House Estates acquired an extensive property portfolio which made it self-sufficient.

The fund administered by the Bridge House Estates is solely responsible for the five City Bridges. There is no financial support from the government or any other fund. If one of the bridges happened to collapse, the charity would have to rebuild it out of the endowment. The good stewardship of the property and investments of the estates by the City has led to the accumulation of surplus funds over any such demand on its resources. Therefore, the City sought from the Charity Commission to implement a cy-près scheme to extend its objects (purposes) since September 1995 to make charitable grants within the Greater London area.

In 2019, total income of the Bridge House Estates was £43.1 million and total expenditure and reinvestment was £53.1 million. The total funds held by the estates are in excess of £1.5 billion.
