= Mechanical paradox =

Apparatus for studying physical paradoxes

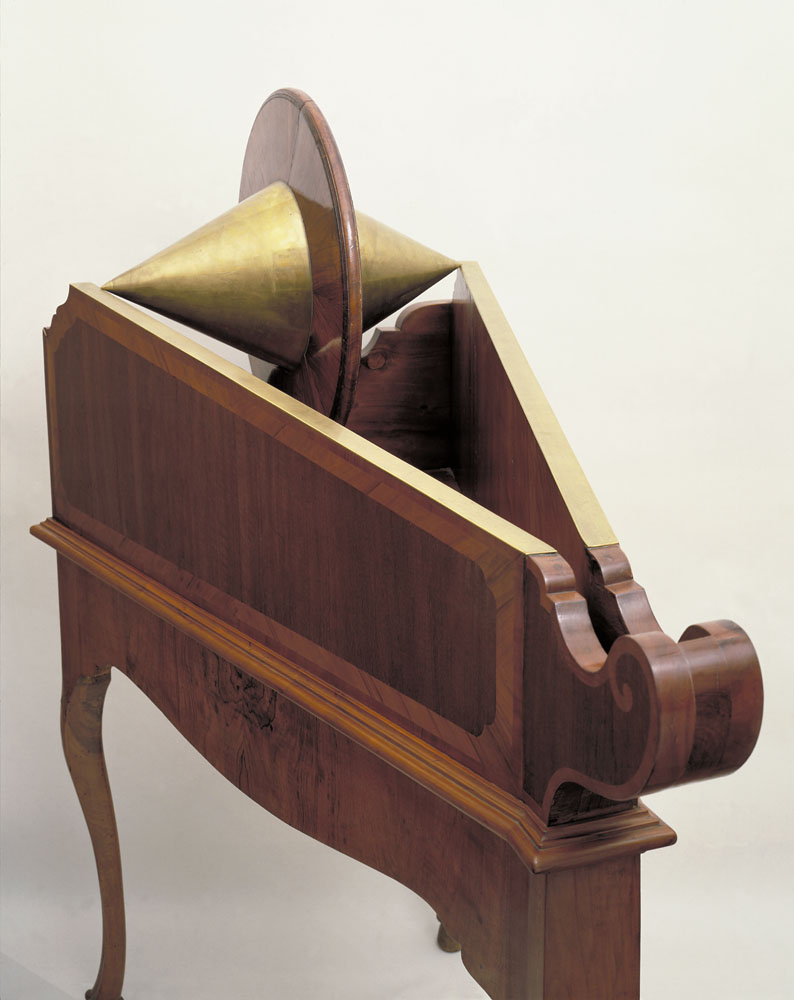
A mechanical paradox

The mechanical paradox is an apparatus for studying physical paradoxes. It consists of a trapezoidal veneered wooden frame with two brass rails, and a pair of brass cones joined at their bases by a wooden disk which rests on the rails. When the double cone is placed at the low end of the frame, it automatically starts to roll upward, giving the impression of escaping the universal law of the gravitational force.

The device's unintuitive behavior is due to the fact that the natural motion of bodies depends on that of their center of gravity, which has a natural tendency to descend. Since the rails diverge, the center of gravity of the double cone—when placed on the rotation axis at its maximum diameter—does not rise when the entire body seems to be moving upward; rather, the center is shifting downward. In its travel, the resting-points of the double cone on the rails converge toward its two apexes. As a result, the distance of the center of gravity from the horizontal plane decreases as the double cone rises.

An example of the instrument is held in the Lorraine collections of the Museo Galileo in Florence, Italy.

It was first published by William Leybourne in 1694.

== Bibliography ==
- Mara Miniati, ed. (1991). Museo di storia della scienza: catalogo. Firenze: Giunti. pp. 292, board n. 6. ISBN 88-09-20036-5.
- Paolo Brenni, ed. (1993). Catalogue of mechanical instruments. Firenze: Giunti. pp. 28, board n. 4. ISBN 88-09-20317-8.
