= Dialling =

Dialling may refer to:

- Dialling (mathematics), the mathematics needed to determine solar time
- Dialling (telephony), making a telephone call
