= Walter Foster =

Walter Foster may refer to:

- Walter Foster (cricketer) (1915–?), Barbadian cricketer
- Walter Foster (mathematician), English mathematician
- Walter Edward Foster (1873–1947), Canadian politician and businessman in New Brunswick
- Walter T. Foster (1891–1981), American artist and publisher of art instruction books
- Walter Foster, 1st Baron Ilkeston (1840–1913), British physician and politician
- Walter W. V. Foster (1908–1944), Canadian politician
- Walter George Foster (1846–1929), New Zealand businessman and politician

== See also ==
- Walter Forster (disambiguation)
