= Roger Tayler =

British astronomer (1929–1997)

Professor Roger Tayler OBE FRS

Professor of Astronomy, University of Sussex
- In office 1967–1996

Gresham Professor of Astronomy
- In office 1969–1975

Personal details
- Born: Roger John Tayler; 25 October 1929
- Died: 23 January 1997 (aged 67)

Roger John Tayler (25 October 1929 – 23 January 1997) was a British astronomer. Tayler made important contributions to stellar structure and evolution, plasma stability, nucleogenesis and cosmology. He wrote a number of textbooks. He collaborated with Fred Hoyle and Stephen Hawking at the University of Cambridge on problems of helium production in cosmology.

== Education ==
He was educated at Solihull School (1940–47) and Clare College, Cambridge, where he won the Mayhew Prize and was awarded MA and PhD degrees. He worked first at the Atomic Energy Research Establishment at Harwell and Culham, and then at Cambridge University where he was a lecturer in mathematics and a Fellow of Corpus Christi College before moving to the University of Sussex in 1966. In 1969 he was appointed professor of astronomy at Gresham College, London.

== Career ==
He was Secretary (1971–79), Treasurer (1979–87) and finally President (1989–90) of the Royal Astronomical Society. In March 1995 he was elected a Fellow of the Royal Society. His candidacy citation read "Roger Tayler's versatile career in Astronomy started with pioneering studies in stellar evolution, including his discovery of semi-convection. At Harwell, his work on plasma stability included a discussion of the stabilised pinch and the prediction of instabilities produced by finite resistivity. He subsequently applied this expertise to a study of the stability of stellar magnetic fields and to the interaction of rotation and magnetic fields with convection. In cosmology, he calculated (with Hoyle) the cosmic helium abundance, stressing the importance of the number of neutrino types, and he pointed out the significance of the neutron half-life. In nucleosynthesis he calculated the abundances of iron peak elements produced at high temperatures, and recently he has been deeply involved with the chemical evolution of galaxies. He has written substantial and penetrating review articles, and text-books used the world over. In addition he has given outstanding public service, especially through the Royal Astronomical Society."

He was appointed OBE in the 1990 New Year Honours.

== See also ==
- Gresham Professor of Astronomy
