= Walter Forster =

Walter Forster may refer to:

- Walter Forster (actor) (1917–1996), Brazilian actor
- Walter Forster (entomologist) (W. Forster, 1910–1986), German entomologist
- Walter Forster (screenwriter) (1900–1968), Austrian screenwriter

== See also ==
- Forster (surname)
- Walter Foster (disambiguation)
