= Gresham Professor of Astronomy =

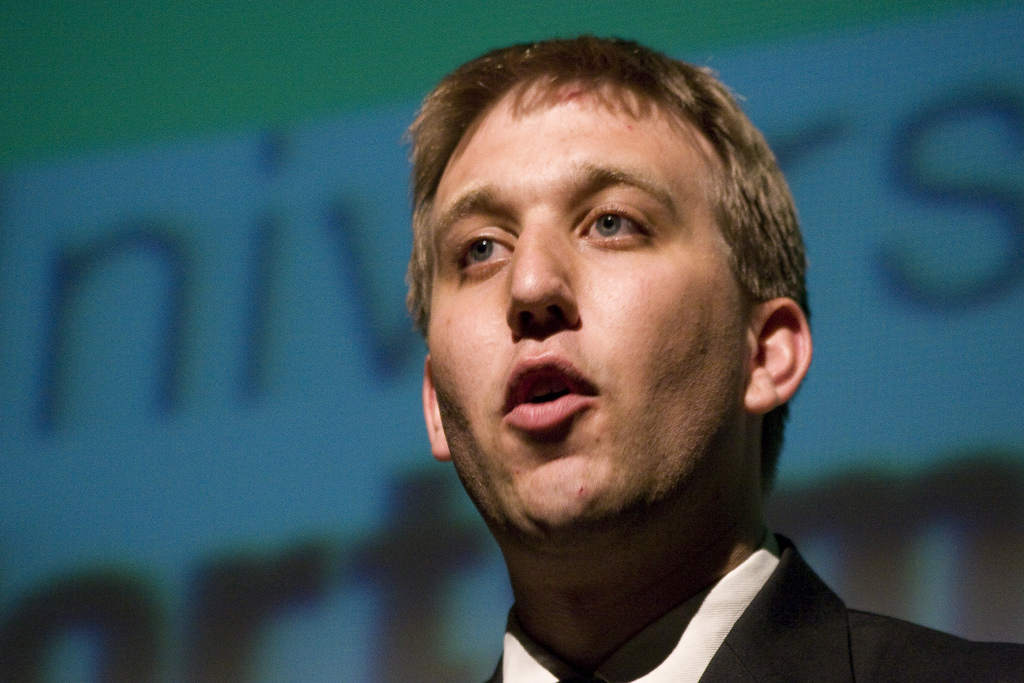
Chris Lintott, appointed Gresham Professor of Astronomy in 2023

The Professor of Astronomy at Gresham College, London, gives free educational lectures to the general public. The college was founded for this purpose in 1597, when it appointed seven professors. Astronomy is one of the original subjects as set out by the will of Thomas Gresham in 1575.

The Professor of Astronomy is appointed in partnership with the City of London Corporation.

== List of Gresham Professors of Astronomy ==
Note, years given as, say, 1596/97 refer to Old Style and New Style dates.

	Name	Started
1	Edward Brerewood	March 1596/97
2	Thomas Williams	11 November 1613
3	Edmund Gunter	6 March 1619/20
4	Henry Gellibrand	2 January 1626/27
5	Samuel Foster	2 March 1636/37
6	Mungo Murray	25 November 1637
7	Samuel Foster	26 May 1641
8	Lawrence Rooke	23 July 1652
9	Sir Christopher Wren	7 August 1657
10	Walter Pope	8 March 1660/61
11	Daniel Man	21 September 1687
12	Alexander Torriano	31 July 1691
13	John Machin	16 May 1713
14	William Romaine	25 June 1751
15	William Cockayne	21 April 1752
16	Peter Sandiford	16 July 1795
17	Joseph Pullen	3 December 1833
18	Edmund Ledger	27 July 1875
19	Samuel Arthur Saunder	2 December 1908
20	Arthur Robert Hinks	17 April 1913
(1939–45 Lectures in abeyance)
21	William Herbert Steavenson	29 May 1946
22	Sir John Carroll	1964
23	Sir Martin Ryle	1968
24	Roger Tayler	1969
25	Sir Martin Rees, Baron Rees of Ludlow FRS	1975
26	David W Dewhirst	1976–80
27	Michael Rowan-Robinson	1981
28	Andrew Fabian	1982
29	Raymond Hide	1984
30	George Porter, Baron Porter of Luddenham OM FRS	1 September 1990
31	Heather Couper FRAS	1 September 1993
32	Colin Pillinger FRS	1 September 1996
33	Frank Close OBE	1 September 2000
34	John D Barrow FRS	1 September 2003
35	Ian Morison FRAS	1 August 2007
36	Carolin Crawford	1 August 2011
37	Joseph Silk	2015
38	Katherine Blundell	2019
39	Chris Lintott	22 June 2023

== See also ==
- Astronomer Royal
- Royal Astronomer of Ireland
