= Ian Morison =

British astronomer (1943–2024)

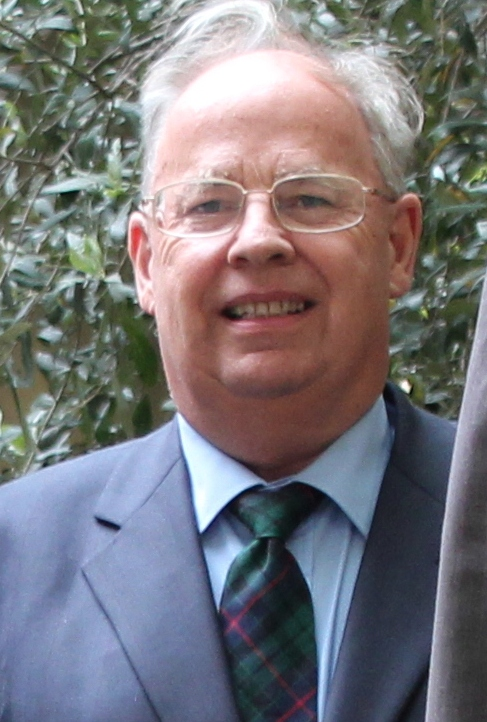
- Born: 22 November 1943; Felpham, England
- Died: 13 April 2024 (aged 80); Macclesfield, England
- Education: University of Oxford
- Scientific career
- Fields: Astronomy; Astrophysics
- Workplaces: University of Manchester; Gresham College
- Website: www.ianmorison.com

Ian Morison (22 November 1943 – 13 April 2024) was a British astronomer and astrophysicist who served as the 35th Gresham Professor of Astronomy.

== Background ==
Ian Morison was born in Felpham, England on 22 November 1943. He attended Chichester High School before going on to study Physics, Mathematics and Astronomy at Hertford College, University of Oxford.

Morison lived in Macclesfield, England with his wife, Judy. He died on 13 April 2024, at the age of 80.

== Career and recognition ==
=== Jodrell Bank Centre for Astrophysics ===
Morison joined the University of Manchester's Jodrell Bank Observatory as a research student in 1965 before becoming a staff member in 1970. Initially working on data acquisition systems for the observatory's own instruments including the Lovell and Mk II radio telescopes, he went on to play a key role in the development of MERLIN, an array of radio telescopes with a resolution in the radio spectrum comparable to that of the Hubble Space Telescope in the optical.

=== Gresham College ===
On 1 August 2007, Morison was appointed as the 35th Gresham Professor of Astronomy, a position previously held by Christopher Wren. He followed John D. Barrow and preceded Carolin Crawford. In this role he delivered a series of 25 public lectures on astronomy and astrophysics. The four-year period of Gresham Professorship came to an end in August 2011.

=== Association with Astronomical Societies ===
Morison was a founding member and patron of Macclesfield Astronomical Society. He was a former council member and president of the Society for Popular Astronomy and patron of Ewell Astronomical Society.

Ian was a popular speaker at many astronomical societies, speaking about the history of the Lovell Telescope at Jodrell Bank, and also about how amateur astronomers can get started with astrophotography.

=== Asteroid ===
Main belt asteroid 15727 Ianmorison was named after Morison.

== Journals ==
- Davis, R. J.; et al. (1975). "Observations of A0620—00 at 962 and 151 MHz". Nature. 257 (5528): 659. Bibcode:1975Natur.257..659D. doi:10.1038/257659a0. S2CID 4201966.
- Davies, J. G.; et al. (1980). "The Jodrell Bank radio-linked interferometer network". Nature. 288 (5786): 64–66. Bibcode:1980Natur.288...64D. doi:10.1038/288064a0. S2CID 4338231.
- Lonsdale, C. J.; Morison, I (1980). "Rotationally symmetric structure in two extragalactic radio sources". Nature. 288 (5786): 66–69. Bibcode:1980Natur.288...66L. doi:10.1038/288066a0. S2CID 4254975.
- Lyne, A. G.; Morison, I (2017). "The Lovell Telescope and its role in pulsar astronomy". Nature Astronomy. Volume 1 835–840

== Bibliography ==
- Astronomy (2004, w. Margaret Penston) ISBN 978-1-843-30451-7
- Pocket Guide to Stars and Planets (2005, w. Margaret Penston) ISBN 978-1-845-37025-1
- Introduction to Astronomy and Cosmology (2008) ISBN 978-0-470-03334-0
- An Amateur's Guide to Observing and Imaging the Heavens (2014) ISBN 978-1-107-61960-9
- A Journey through the Universe: Gresham Lectures on Astronomy (2014) ISBN 978-1-107-07346-3
- The Art of Astrophotography (2017) ISBN 978-1-316-61841-7

== See also ==
- Gresham Professor of Astronomy
