= John Twysden =

English physician

- Born: 1607; East Peckham, Kent, England
- Died: 13 September 1688 (aged 80–81)
- Occupation: Physician

John Twysden (1607 – 13 September 1688) was an English physician.

== Biography ==
Twysden was the fourth son of Sir William Twysden, first baronet in 1611, was born at Roydon Hall in East Peckham, Kent, in 1607 (Hasted, Kent, ii. 275). Sir Roger Twysden and Sir Thomas Twysden were his brothers. John was educated at University College, Oxford, whence he matriculated on 20 June 1623; he left the university without a degree and entered the Inner Temple, where he was called to the bar in 1634. In 1645 he was in Paris (Mathematical Lucubrations), and in 1646 graduated M.D. at Angers. He was incorporated at Oxford 6 Nov. 1651 (Wood, ii. 107), and in 1654 settled in London, and on 22 December was admitted a candidate of the College of Physicians, and on 20 October 1664 was elected a fellow.

His friend Walter Foster of Emmanuel College, Cambridge, placed in his hands the mathematical remains of Samuel Foster after the death of that Gresham professor in 1652. His first work, published in London in 1654, was an edition of Foster's ‘Four Treatises of Dialing,’ and in 1659 he published the residue of Foster's papers, with some mathematical essays of his own, in a folio volume entitled ‘Miscellanies or Mathematical Lucubrations.’ He published in 1666 ‘Medicina veterum Vindicata, or an Answer to a book entitled Medela Medicinæ,’ a defence of the orthodox medical doctrines of the day against Marchamont Needham. The book, which is dedicated to Lord-chancellor Clarendon, and to the chiefs of the three courts, Keeling, Bridgman, and Hales, shows a good deal of general learning and much power of argument, while many passages illustrate the author's taste for mathematics, but it contains no clinical or pathological observations. In the same year he published another book of the same kind, an ‘Answer to Medicina Instaurata’ (London, 8vo). In 1676 Needham was defeated in an action by the College of Physicians before Twysden's brother, Sir Thomas Twysden, in the court of king's bench (Goodall, Col. of Physicians, p. 273). He continued his mathematical studies, and published in 1685 ‘The Use of the Great Planisphere called the Analemma.’ He died unmarried on 13 September 1688. He was buried on the 15th in St. Margaret's Church, Westminster. His account of the last illness and death of his mother and two letters are extant in Brit. Mus. Addit. MSS. 34173 and 34176.
