= Walter Foster (mathematician) =

English mathematician

Walter Foster (fl. 1652), was an English mathematician.

Foster was the elder brother of Samuel Foster. He was educated at Emmanuel College, Cambridge, of which he became a fellow. He took the two degrees in arts, B.A. in 1617, M.A. in 1621, and commenced B.D. in 1628. Dr. Samuel Ward, in a letter to Archbishop Ussher, dated from Sidney Sussex College, Cambridge, 25 May 1630, says that Foster had taken some pains upon the Latin copy of Ignatius's 'Epistles' in Caius College Library, and adds that as he was 'shortly to depart from the colledg by his time there allotted, finding in himself some impediment in his utterance, he could wish to be employed by your lordship in such like business. He is a good scholar, and an honest man'. Despite the impediment in his speech he was afterwards rector of Allerton in Somersetshire.

John Twysden, who edited Samuel Foster's papers after his 1652 death, commends Walter Foster for his skill in mathematics, and says that he communicated to him his brother's papers, which are published in his Miscellanies (Preface to the same). There is a tetrastich of his writing among the 'Epigrammata in Radulphi Wintertoni Metaphrasin' published at the end of Hippocratis Aphorismi soluti et metrici, 8vo, Cambridge, 1633. In 1652 he was living at Sherborne, Dorsetshire, and in the May of that year his brother bequeathed him ‘fourescore pounds and his library in Gresham Colledge.’

== Sources ==
- This article incorporates text from a publication now in the public domain: "Foster, Walter". Dictionary of National Biography. London: Smith, Elder & Co. 1885–1900.
