= John Deval =

British sculptor (1701–1774)

John Deval (1701–1774) was an 18th-century British sculptor and Master Mason, as was his namesake son (1728–1794). He was Chief Mason to the Crown and was the mason for the Tower of London and Royal Mews.

== Life ==
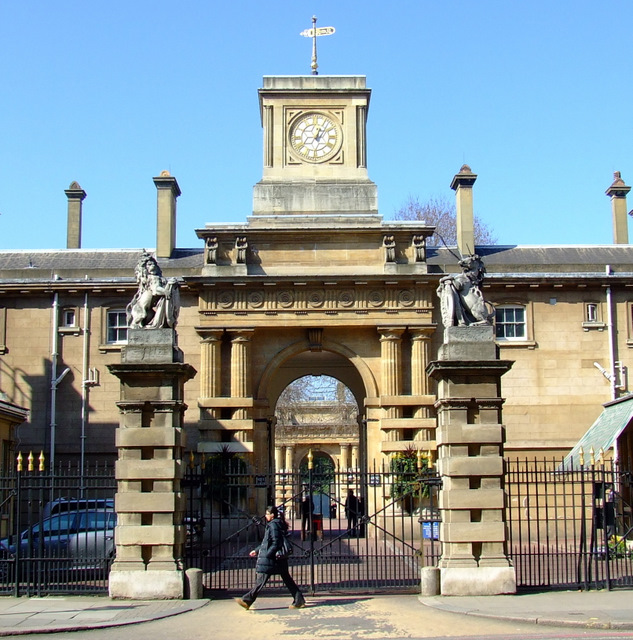
Main entrance to the Royal Mews

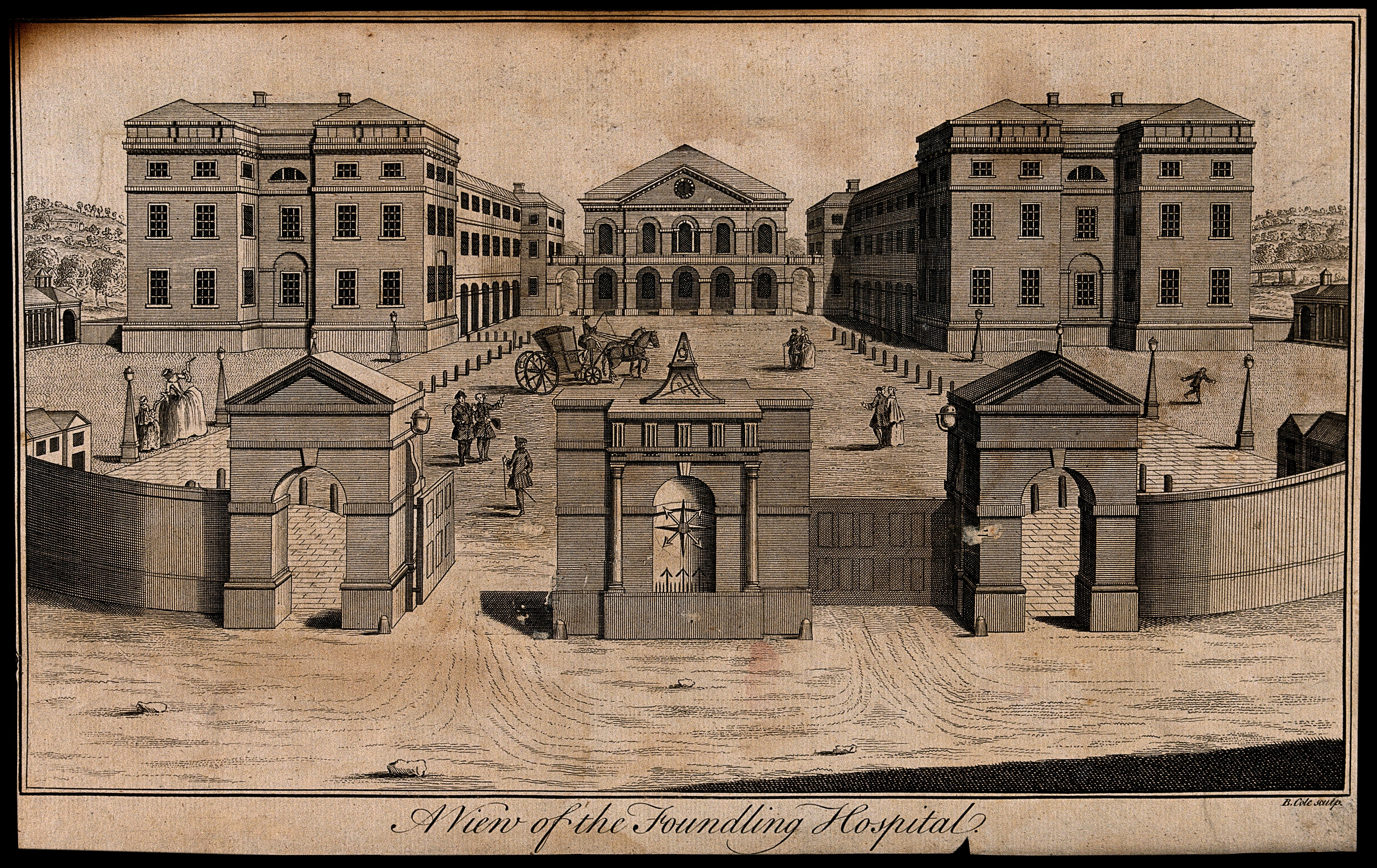
The Foundling Hospital, Holborn, London

He was born in Eynsham in Oxfordshire, the son of George Deval who died shortly before his birth. In 1718 he was a "bound apprentice" to Joshua Fletcher of Woodstock, Oxfordshire. He became a Freeman in 1727 and went to work for Andrew Jelfe in London.

Around 1750 he became Master Mason to the King and in 1760 he became Master of the Worshipful Company of Masons in London, the highest position a mason could reach.

He died in 1774 and was buried at Isleworth.

== John Deval the younger ==
Born in 1728 he trained under his father and became Master Mason to the King in 1774 and in 1784 followed in his shoes as being made Master of the Worshipful Company of Masons.

== Known works (Elder) ==
- St Olave's Church, Southwark (1737)
- Kimbolton Castle (1738)
- Marble tables for Lord Folkestone at Longford Castle (1738)
- Chimneypieces for Sir Richard Hoare at Barn Elms House (1739)
- Mansion House, London (1739 to 1750)
- Guy's Hospital (1739)
- Cornbury House (1740)
- Foundling Hospital London (1742 to 1752) note – chapel built 1747
- Ongoing repairs to the Tower of London (1750 to 1770) reducing fortifications
- Relief panels in hall and chimneypieces throughout Woburn Abbey (1751)
- Chimneypieces at Weald Hall for Christopher Tower (1755)
- Huge Chimneypiece at Milton Hall for Lord Fitzwilliam (1756)
- Chimneypieces for Nostell Priory for Sir Rowland Winn (1767)
- Newgate Prison (1769)

== Known works (Younger) ==
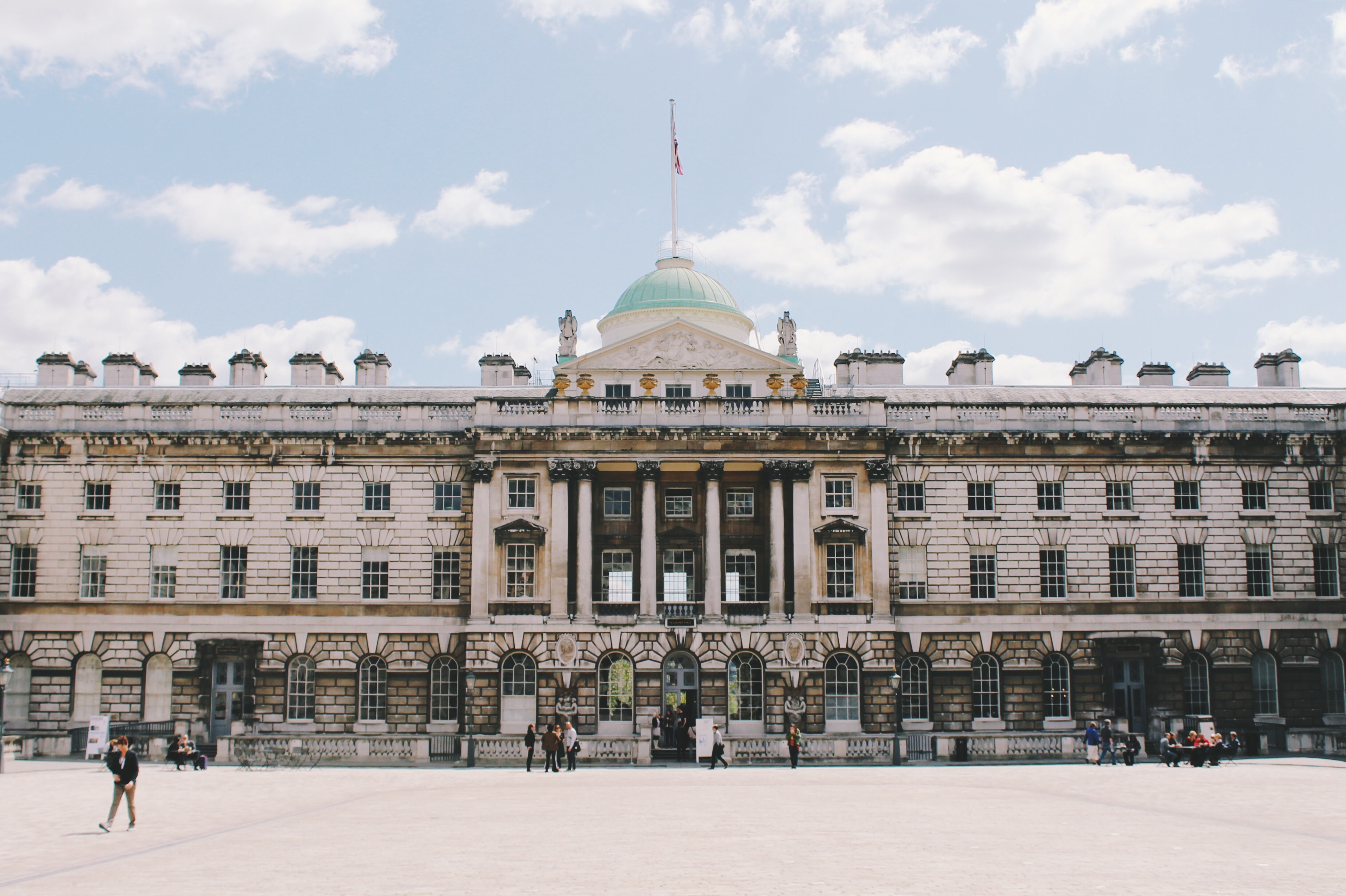
South front of Somerset House

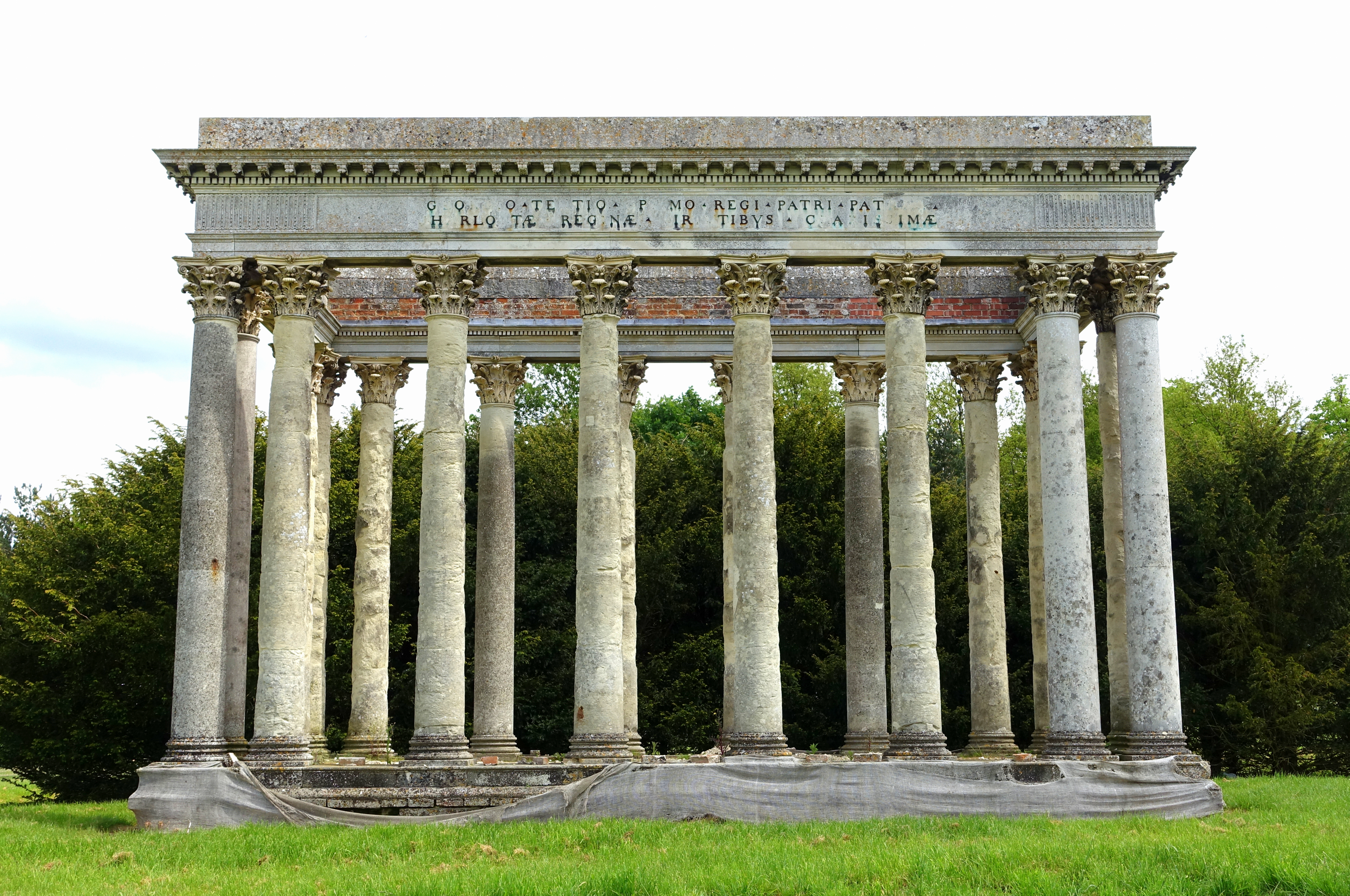
Temple Of Concord at Audley End

- Repairs at remodelling of Cobham Hall (1776 to 1778)
- North and south fronts of Somerset House (1777 to 1786)
- Mausoleum to the Earl of Radnor at Britford churchyard (1779)
- Chimneypiece for the Long Gallery at Longford Castle (1780)
- Coutts Bank on the Strand, London {1780 to 1789)
- King's Bench Prison (1780 to 1784)
- House for the Marshal of the King's Bench Prison (1781 to 1782)
- Argyll House, London (1783)
- Chimneypieces at Earsham Hall for William Windham (1783)
- Chimneypieces at Attingham Park for Lord Berwick (1785)
- Queen Mary block at Greenwich Palace (1784 to 1789)
- Remodelling of sections of Audley End into a Georgian style (1785)
- Monument to Thomas Spackman at Cliffe Pypard (1786)
- New government offices next to the Admiralty (1786 to 1791)
- Chimneypieces for Bedford House (1787)
- Marblework for the Royal Naval Chapel at Greenwich (1788)
- Remodelling of Prince Edward's apartments at St James's Palace (1788)
- Statuary and marble chimneypieces for Carlton House for the Prince of Wales (1788)
- Remodelling at Woburn Abbey (1790/1)
- Marble column at Colne Park (1791)
- The Temple of Concord at Audley End (1791)
- New guardrooms at St James's Palace (1793)
- The Waiting Room at St James's Palace (1793)

=== Gallery ===
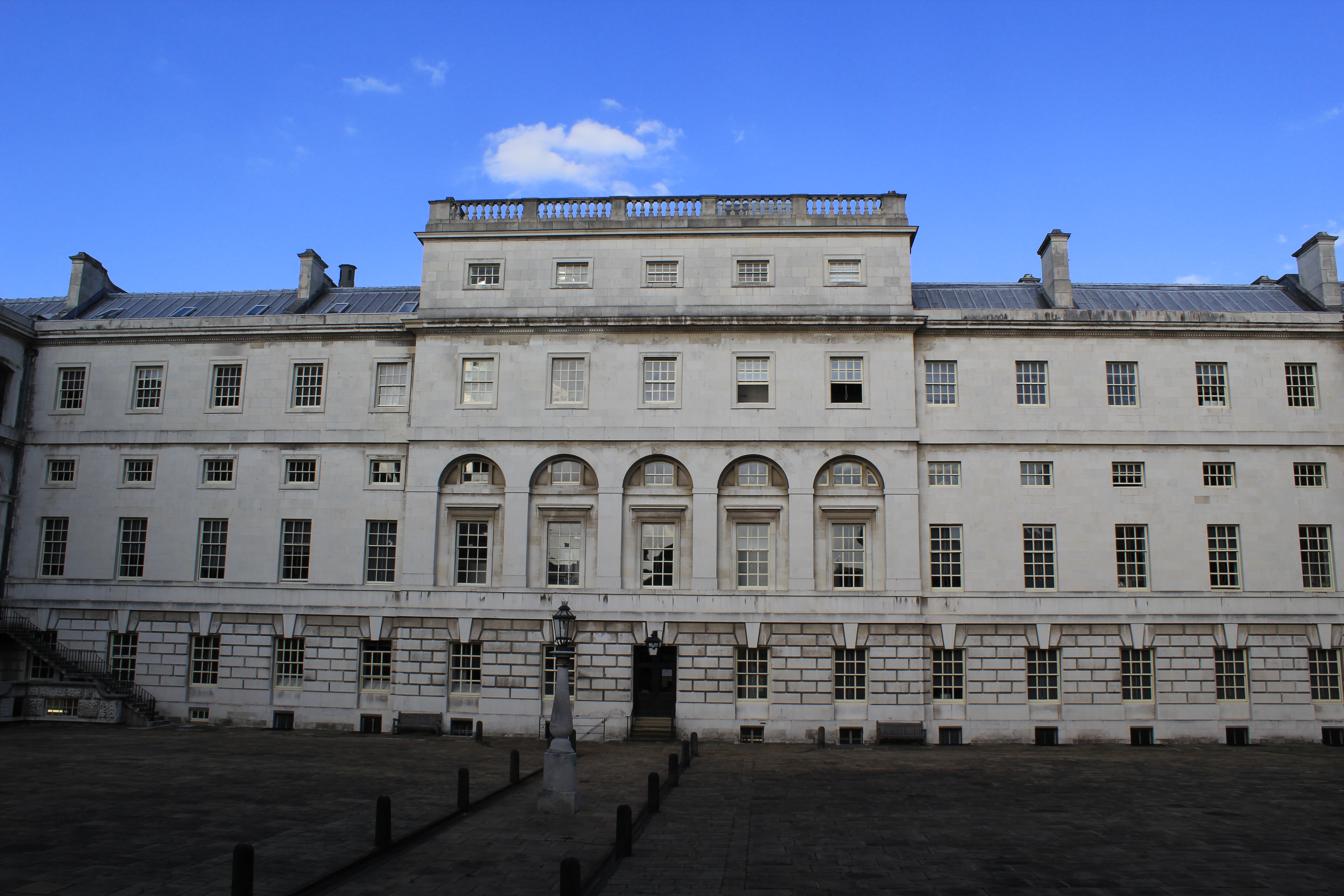
Queen Mary block at Greenwich

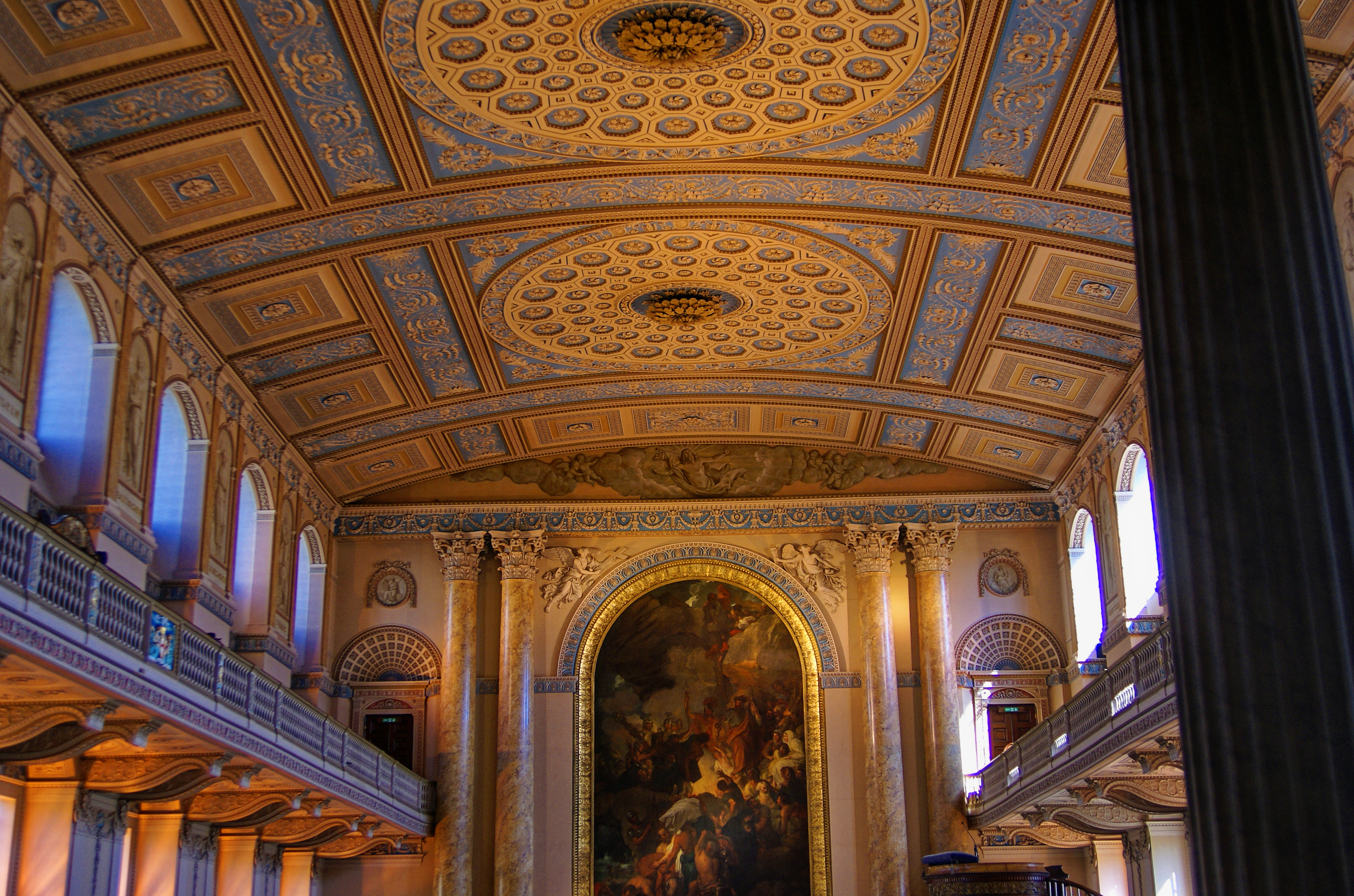
Interior marblework at Royal Naval Chapel in Greenwich

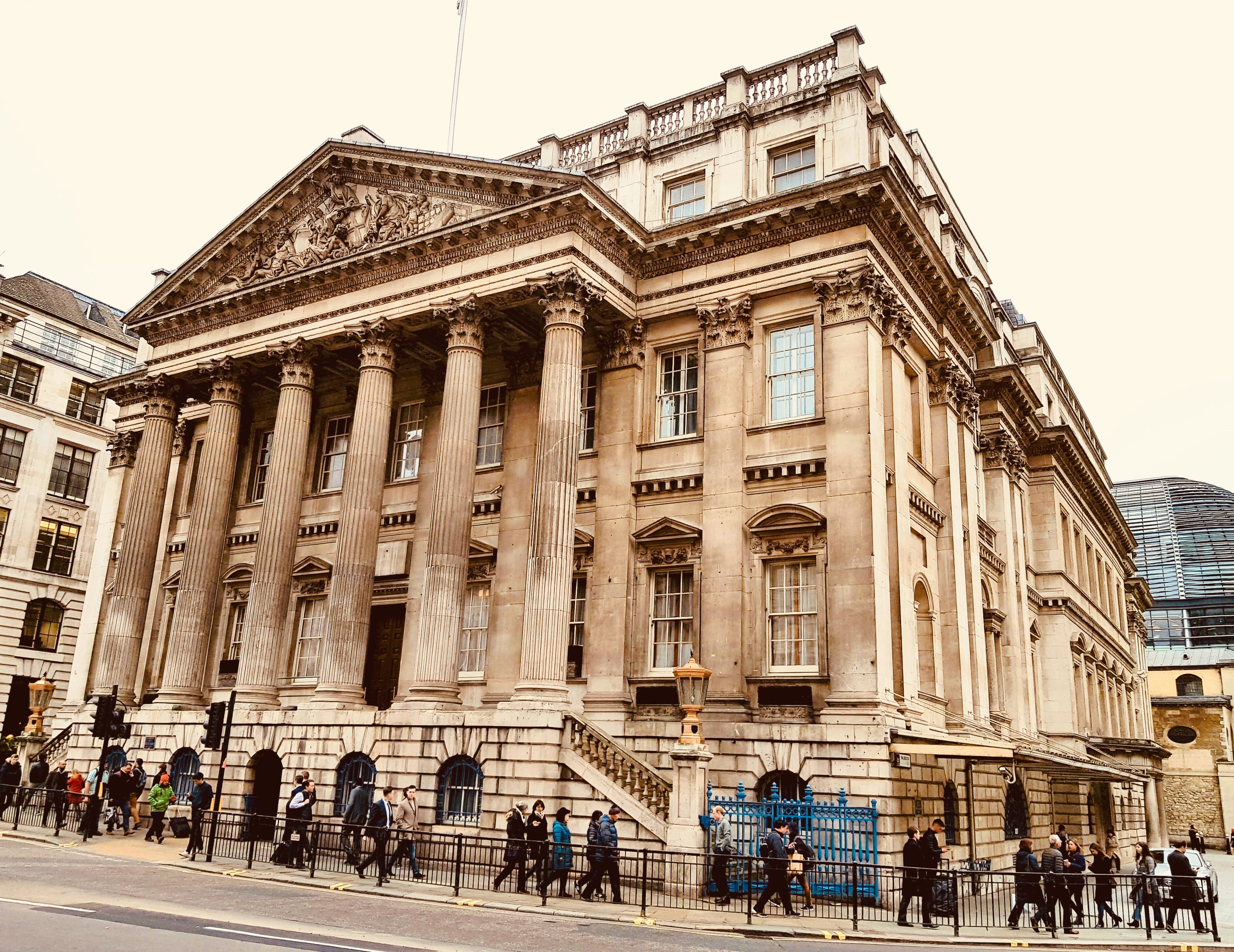
Mansion House in London

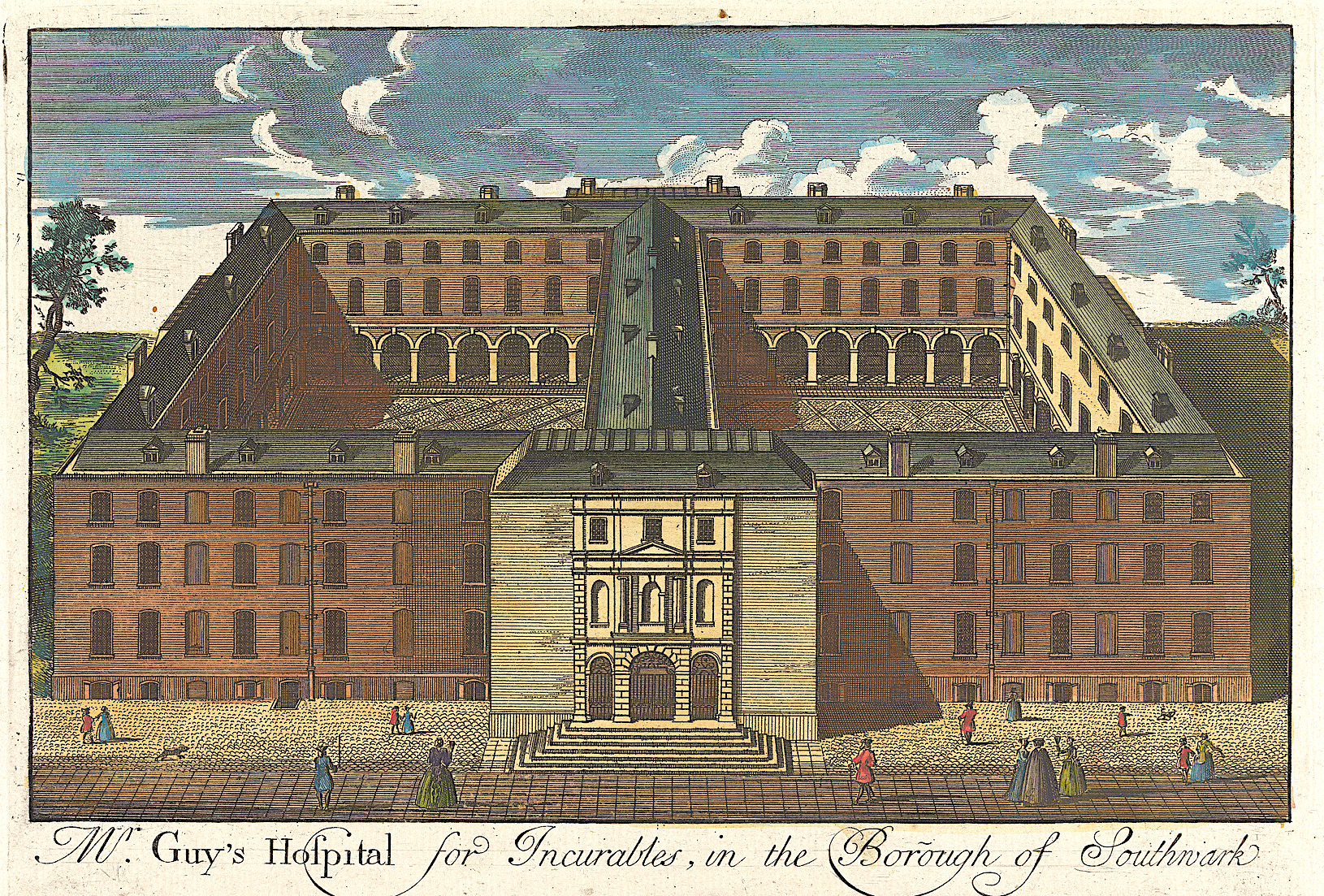
Guy's Hospital in 18th century

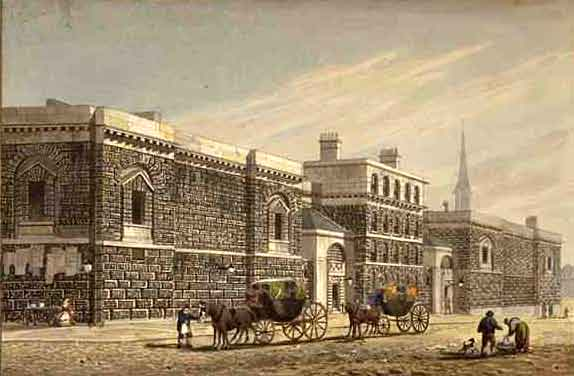
Newgate Prison

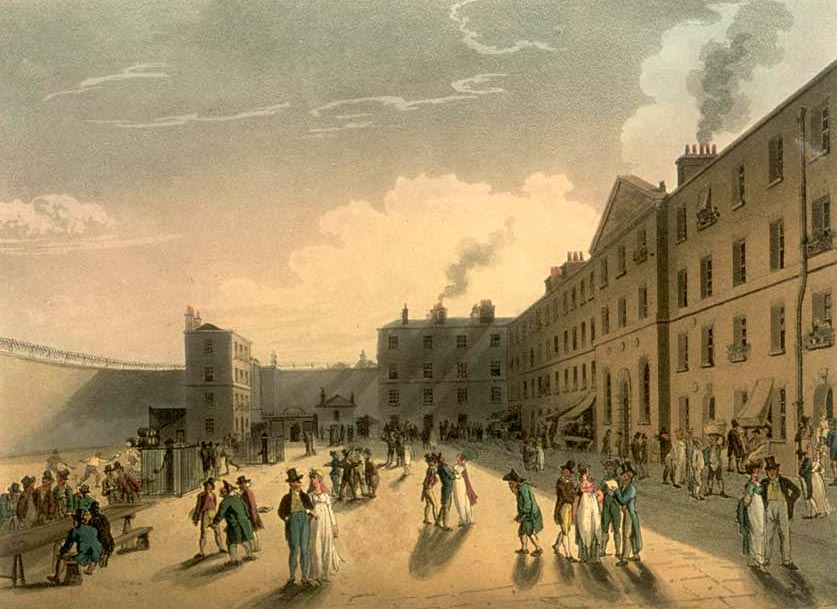
King's Bench Prison
