= Samuel Foster =

English mathematician and astronomer

Samuel Foster (c. 1600 – July 1652) was an English mathematician and astronomer. He made several observations of eclipses, both of the sun and moon, at Gresham College and in other places; and he was known particularly for inventing and improving planetary instruments.

== Life ==
A native of Northamptonshire, he was admitted a sizar at Emmanuel College, Cambridge on 23 April 1616, as a member of which he proceeded B.A. in 1619, and M.A. in 1623. On the death of Henry Gellibrand, he was elected Gresham Professor of Astronomy on 2 March 1636, but resigned later in the year and was succeeded by Mungo Murray. In 1641, Murray having vacated the professorship by his marriage, Foster was re-elected on 26 May.

During the civil war and Commonwealth he was one of the society of gentlemen who met in London for cultivating the 'new philosophy,' in the group around Charles Scarburgh. In 1646 John Wallis received from Foster a theorem on spherical triangles (two antipodal triangles, that is two triangles formed from corresponding antipodal vertices, are congruent) which he afterwards published in his Mechanica. Wallis's retrospective account of the origins of the Royal Society made Foster's lectures a rendezvous of the London-based Scarburgh-Jonathan Goddard group; but it is disputed to what extent this connection was with Gresham College and its tradition, rather than simply the location.

Foster died at Gresham College in May 1652, and was buried in the church of St. Peter the Poor in Broad Street.

== Works ==
He published little himself, but many treatises written by him were printed after his death, though John Twysden and Edmund Wingate, his editors, state that long illness caused them to be left very imperfect, and Twysden complains that some people had taken advantage of his liberality by publishing his works as their own (Preface to Foster's Miscellanies). In the following list of Foster's works, only the first two were published before his death:

- The Use of the Quadrant, London, 1624. An octavo edition was published soon after the author's death in 1652 by A. Thompson, who says in his preface that the additional lines were invented, and the uses written, for an 'appendix' to Edmund Gunter's 'Quadrant;' only a few copies were printed alone for Foster's friends. It was republished in the 5th edition of The Works of Edmund Gunter (1673, pp. 129–164).
- The Art of Dialling; by a new, easie, and most speedy way, London, 1638. (transcript from EEBO) A second edition published in 1675, has several additions and variations taken from the author's own manuscript, and also a 'Supplement' by the editor, William Leybourn. John Collins published in 1659 Geometrical Dyalling, being a full explication of divers difficulties in the works of learned Mr. Samuel Foster (transcript from EEBO).
- Posthuma Fosteri, the description of a ruler, upon which is inscribed divers scales and the uses thereof. [edited by Edmund Wingate], London, 1652. (transcript from EEBO)
- Elliptical or Azimuthal Horologiography, edited by John Twysden and Edmund Wingate, 4 pts, London, 1654. (transcript from EEBO)
  - Elliptical or Azimuthal Horologiography
  - Circular Horologiography
  - Rectilineal or Diametral Horologiography
  - Elliptical Horologiography
- Miscellanea: siue lucubrationes mathematics [Miscellanies: or Mathematical lucubrations], edited by John Twysden, a collection of works by Foster written in English and Latin, some translated by Twysden, with a few intermediate additions by Twysden and a few works by other authors appended by publisher William Leybourn. Latin and English, 19 pts. fol. London, 1659. (alternative scan from e-rara) The sections by Foster are:
  - Stellae Fixae [Catalog of Fixed Stars],
  - Astroscopium
  - De Instrumentis Planetariis [Of the Planetary Instruments]
  - Observationes Eclipsium
  - Ratio facillima Computandi altitudinem Solis horariam ad quamlibet latitudinem [An easie way to calculate Tables of the Suns Horarie altit. for any latitude]
  - Problemata Geometrica Varia [Various Geometrical Problems]
  - Problemata Quaedam succincta condendi Canones Sinuum, Tangentium, & Secantium [Forming Tables of Sines, Tangents, & Secants]
  - Demonstratio Quadrantis Horometrici [Demonstration of a Horometrical Quadrant]
  - Epitome Aristarchi Samii De Magnitudinibus, & Distantiis trium Corporum, Solis, Lunae, & Terrae, epitome of Aristarchus of Samos's On the Sizes and Distances
  - Lemmata Archimedis, translation by John Greaves of the Book of Lemmas, attributed to Archimedes, from Arabic to Latin, revised by Foster
  - The Geometrical Square
  - Of Projection
  - Precepts Concerning Refracted Dials
- The Sector Altered; and Other Scales Added, an improvement of Gunter's sector, printed in The Works of Edmund Gunter, 4th edition (1662) and 5th edition (1673, pp. 157–195), by William Leybourn, who in the latter edition corrected some mistakes which had appeared in the former from Foster's own manuscript.
- The Description and Use of the Nocturnal [London? 1685?].

Foster left numerous manuscript treatises in addition to those printed by his friends. Of these two were in the possession of William Jones, F.R.S.: The Uses of a General Quadrant, and Select Uses of the Quadrant, dated 1649.
