= Mungo Murray (writer) =

British writer on shipbuilding

- Died: 19 October 1770
- Occupation: Writer on shipbuilding

Mungo Murray (died 19 October 1770) was a British writer on shipbuilding.

== Biography ==
Murray published in 1754 a 'Treatise on Shipbuilding and Navigation,' 4to. On the title-page he describes himself as 'Shipwright in his Majesty's yard, Deptford;' and in an advertisement it is stated that in the evenings, from six to eight, except Wednesdays and Saturdays, he taught 'the several branches of mathematics treated of in the book,' and sold mathematical instruments. In May 1758 he was appointed to the Magnanime, with Lord Howe, in the rating of midshipman, but in reality, it would seem, as a teacher of mathematics and navigation; and on 9 January 1760 he received a warrant as schoolmaster. In June 1762 he was turned over, with Howe, to the Princess Amelia, which was paid oft at the peace (Pay-book of Magnanime and Princess Amelia). During his service in the Magnanime, which embraced the date of the battle of Quiberon Bay, he published 'The Rudiments of Navigation . . . compiled for the use of the Young Gentlemen on board the Magnanime,' 1760, 8vo (there was a copy in the library of the Royal Society). In 1764 he wrote a short note on an eclipse of the sun, which was printed in the 'Philosophical Transactions' (liv. 171). In 1765 he issued a new and enlarged edition of his 'Treatise on Shipbuilding,' and at some later date 'Four Prints (with references and explanations), exhibiting the different Views of a Sixty-gun Ship.' The prints, but not the explanations, were in the British Museum. These last were in the library of the Royal United Service Institution. He describes himself on the title-page as then carpenter of the Weymouth. He also published 'Forty Plates of Elevations, Sections, and Plans of different Vessels.' The copy in the British Museum wants the title-page. He died 19 October 1770. When in the Magnanime his wages were paid to Christian Murray, presumably his wife.
