= London Bridge Hospital =

- HCA International
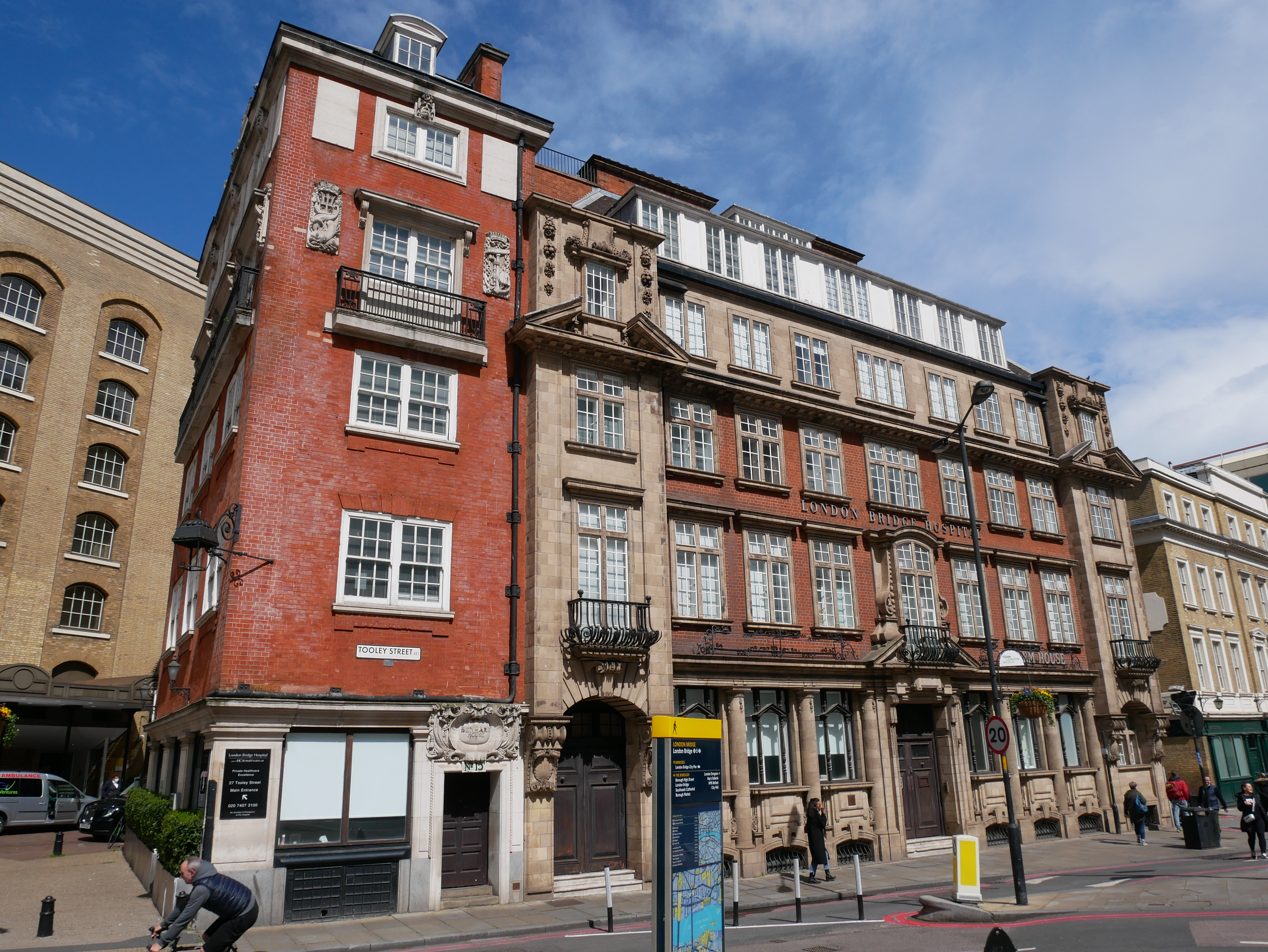

- Shown in Southwark

Geography
- Location: Tooley Street; London, SE1; United Kingdom
- Coordinates: 51.5064°N 0.0859°W

Organisation
- Care system: Private

Services
- Emergency department: No

Links
- Website: www.londonbridgehospital.com

The London Bridge Hospital is a private hospital on the south bank of the River Thames in London.

== History ==
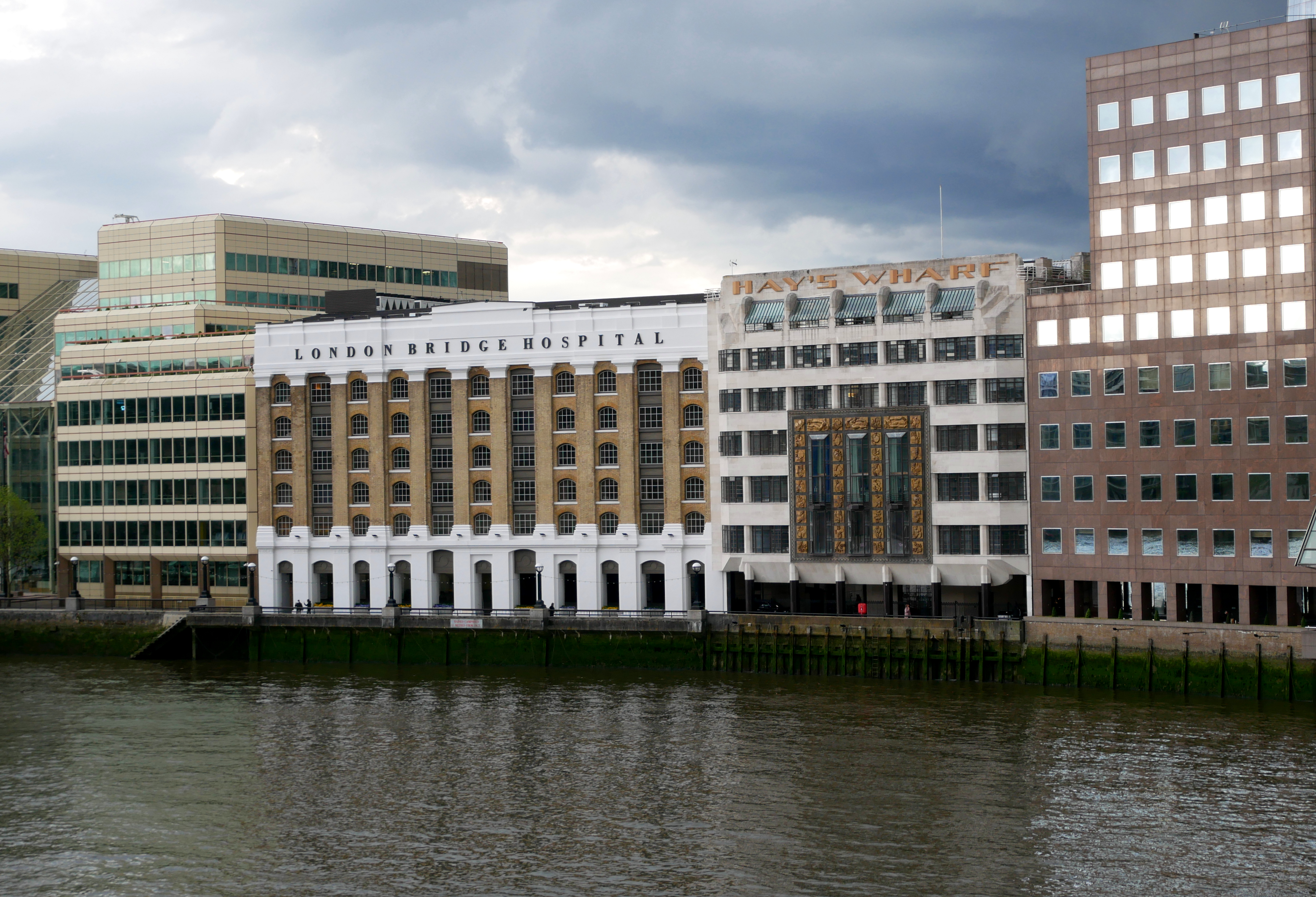
The north face of London Bridge Hospital and the adjacent St Olaf House

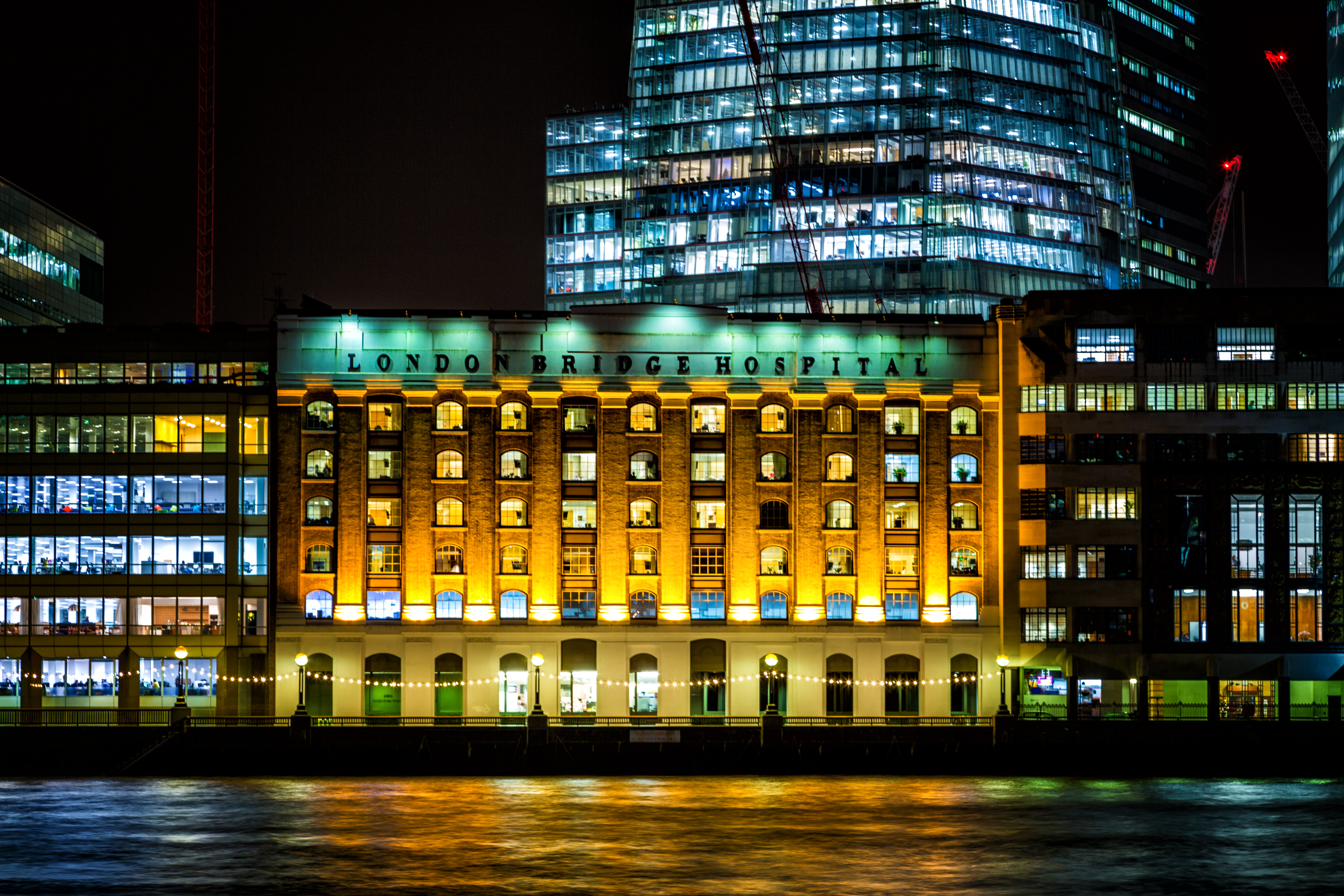
River view at night

The hospital, which was designed by Llewelyn Davies Weeks and built by Bovis Construction, opened in 1986. It belongs, along with several other well-known private London hospitals, to HCA International, the largest private operator of health care facilities in the world.

In April 2006, it expanded its outpatients operations into the adjacent building, St Olaf House - the first art deco building in the UK. Then in November 2013 it took three floors in the Shard and in September 2016 it moved its fertility services to the Shard.

== See also ==
- List of hospitals in England
- The Lister Hospital, London
- HCA
