= William Leybourn =

English surveyor and mathematician

William Leybourn (1626—1716) was an English mathematician and land surveyor, author, printer and bookseller.

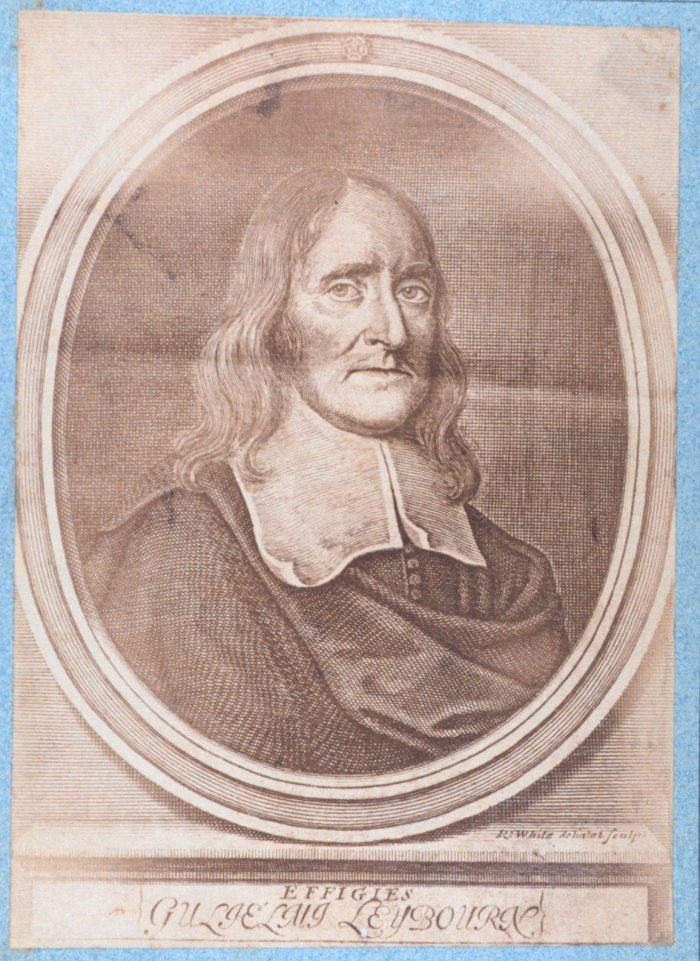
A portrait of William Leybourn, from "La Science de l'arpenteur : dans toute son etendue", by Dupain de Montesson

== Career as a printer ==
During the late 1640s Robert Leybourn's press in Monkswell Street near Cripplegate, London was occupied with books and pamphlets of a political, martial and millenarian nature. He printed John Arrowsmith's sermon to the houses of parliament, England's Eben-ezer in 1645, and his Great Wonder in Heaven in 1647. In 1646 he published a pamphlet A Defence of Master Chaloner's Speech, and an early edition of The Marrow of Modern Divinity attributed to Edward Fisher: in 1648 appeared The Differences in Scotland stil on foot, and from 1648 an almanack or Moderate Intelligencer of military affairs entitled Mercurius Republicus. Robert Leybourn gave the apparently fraudulent ascription to Sir William Davenant of Edmund Bolton's historical poem London, King Charles his Augusta, or City Royal of 1648. He printed Joseph Mede's sermon on St. Peter's prediction of the apocalypse, and a work called The Englishe Catholike Christian by one Thomas de la More, minister, followed in 1649.

Into his industrious hands William Leybourn introduced the second year of his astronomical almanac, Speculum Anni for 1649, and also the important astronomical work he had written with Vincent Wing, their Urania Practica, together with their reply to the criticisms of Julian Shakerley. From this time forth the Leybourn press found its direction in the works of William Leybourn, and of Vincent Wing, and for a wide range of serious works of astronomy, mathematics, surveying, military matters, and the like. In 1650 was printed Richard Elton's The Complete Body of the Art Military, John Wybard's Tactometria, seu Tetagmenomentria: or, the geometry of regulars practically proposed, John Chatfield's The Trigonall Sector: the description and use thereof and the two parts of Thomas Rudd's Practical Geometry, and also John Spencer's Catalogue of the Library of Sion House, as well as Leybourn's own Planometria, or the Whole Art of Surveying Land under the pseudonym 'Oliver Wallinby'.

In 1651 William Leybourn entered into a business partnership with Robert Leybourn as a printer and seller of books. Their extensive catalogue thereafter became one of the most important of its time in the publishing or re-publishing of such materials. The second and third (posthumous) editions of Samuel Foster's The Art of Dialling (which first appeared in 1638), with additional materials, was an early success. The press closed in 1666, following the Great Fire of London (in which almost the entire second edition of Wing's Geodætes Practicus, 1666, was incinerated), after which William moved to Northcott in Southall, Middlesex.

== Career as an author ==
In 1648, Leybourn wrote Urania Practica with Vincent Wing, the first substantial compendium of astronomy written in the English language. This was printed by Robert Leybourn in London. Leybourn's press also printed other books of Wing's such as Geodaetes Practicus.

Planometria, or, The Whole Art of Surveying of Land was a pamphlet written in 1650 by Leybourn and published under the pseudonym Oliver Wallinby. Leybourn expanded this into a full book, The Compleat Surveyor which was first published in 1653, by his own press. This was the first book published on the subject that did not contain an extensive argument justifying surveying. It outlined the various instruments used in surveying, and how they were employed. It remained one of the standard references in the field into the 18th century. It instructed property surveyors on the construction of property maps, and how to make the appropriate coloured inks for the maps. At this time, the use of private estate maps was starting to become fashionable, providing clients with satisfying coloured maps for their guests to view. The book also contains instructions on mathematical measures. The section on the use of Gunter's chains as a unit of length shows early use of decimals in surveying. Leybourn later expanded and clarified this in his 1657 work Arithmetick, Vulgar, Decimal and Instramental.

In 1669 Leybourn authored The Art of Dialling, a book on the use of sun-dials and astrolabes in determining the position of vessels at sea. The contemporary expansion of the Royal Navy and Merchant Marines created a significant demand for such manuals, and The Art of Dialling was well written, easy to understand and cheaply produced.

Leybourn's 1693 work Panarithmologia, being a mirror for merchants, breviate for bankers, treasure for tradesmen, mate for mechanicks, and a sure guide for purchasers, sellers, or mortgagers of land, leases, annuities, rents, pensions, etc. ... and a constant concomitant fitted for all men's occasions. remained widely printed longer than any other of his works. Over twenty editions were printed, and printing remained active into the 19th century.

== Career as a surveyor ==
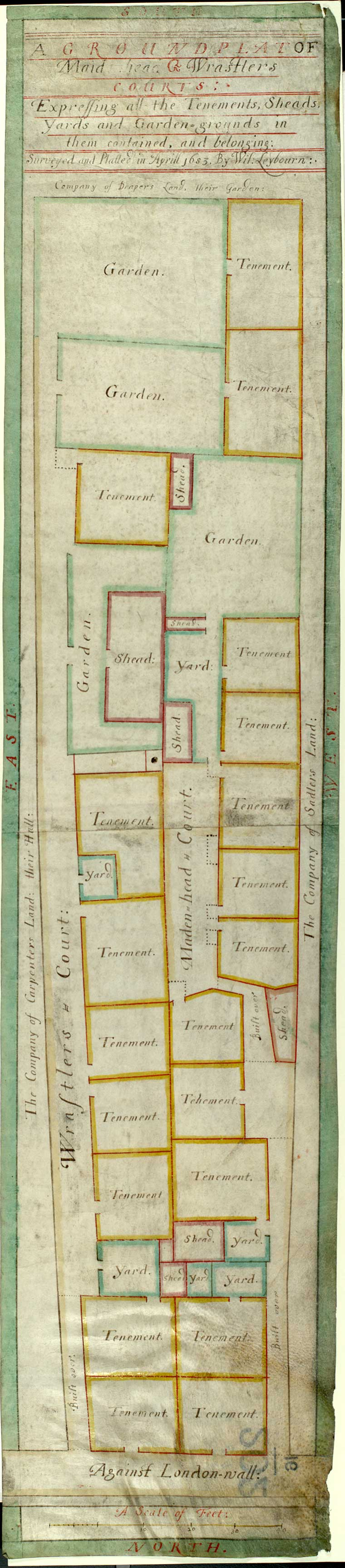
Maidenhead and Wrastler's Court, drawn by William Leybourn, April 1683

Leybourn acquired a good reputation as surveyor of land, and was often hired to survey the estates of gentlemen. In 1672, six years after the Great Fire of London, John Ogilby hired Leybourn to lead a survey of London. Leybourn identified the need for books that explained the techniques for measuring building materials that were widely accessible, both in cost and language. This was needed for both determining the extent of the damage from the Great Fire, and for calculating the cost of repairs.

It was believed that Leybourn was the designer of the emblem of the Bridge House Estates Trust, which was charged with maintaining the first stone bridge over the River Thames. The emblem, sometimes known as the "Southwark Cross" but correctly the "Bridge House Mark" may have been adopted by Leybourn from a mark used on surveying maps to denote properties of the Bridge House in the 1550s: an earlier version in the London Museum on a stone of the Bridge is dated 1509, and the modern version can be seen in use (before Leybourn's appointment) on the City sword-rest of 1674 now in Southwark Cathedral. The trust retains that emblem to this day.
