= St Olaf House =

Listed building in Southwark, London

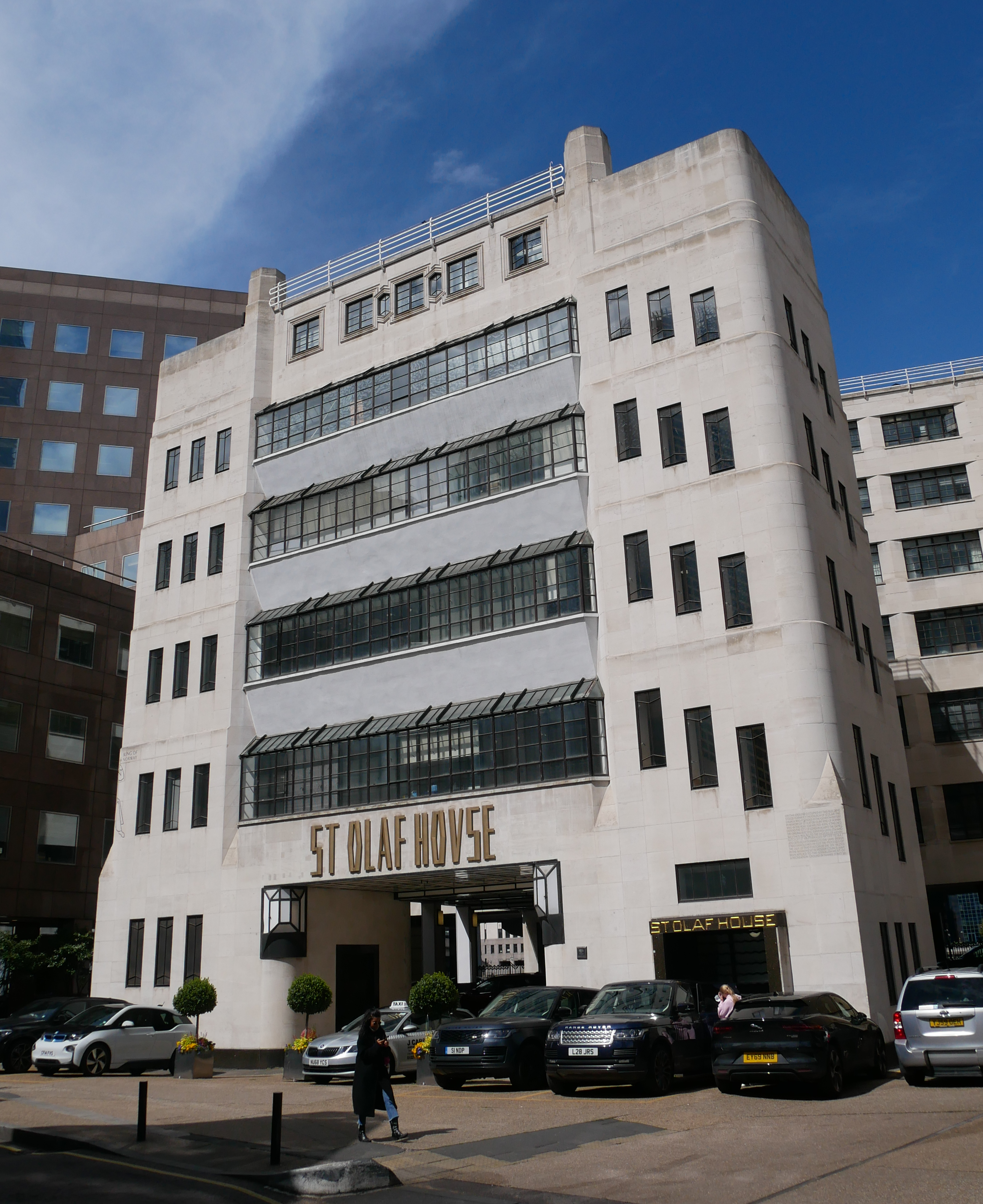
- The south face of St Olaf House in 2021
- Interactive map of the St Olaf House area

General information
- Status: Complete

Listed Building – Grade II*
- Official name: St Olaf House
- Designated: 13 May 1971
- Reference no.: 1385977
- Type: House
- Architectural style: Art deco
- Location: Bermondsey, London Borough of Southwark, 27 Tooley Street, London, United Kingdom
- Coordinates: 51.5064°N 0.0864°W
- Construction started: 1928

Technical details
- Material: Portland stone

St Olaf House is a Grade II* listed building on Tooley Street in the London Borough of Southwark. The house was built on the site of St Olave's Church between 1928 and 1932, and is now part of London Bridge Hospital.

== History ==
St Olaf House was built between 1928 and 1932 by Harry Stuart Goodhart-Rendel as a headquarters for the Hay's Wharf Company. The house was built on the site of the demolished St Olave's Church, Southwark, in the art deco style. The building is made out of Portland stone. It is six storeys high, T-shaped, and faces the River Thames. The entrance hall has a terrazzo floor. The exterior has 39 terracotta panels designed by Frank Dobson. Outside the building, there is also a black and gold mosaic by Dobson depicting Saint Olaf, the Norwegian king who helped protect London from the Danes in 1014. The engraver commissioned was Robert Lambert Gapper, then a post-army student under Henry Moore. There is also an inscription about the former St Olave's Church.

Hay's Wharf became disused in 1969. In the 1980s, St Olaf House was purchased by London Bridge Hospital; it is used for consultation rooms and the hospital's cardiology department. It became a Grade II* listed building in 1971, and is part of the Tooley Street conservation area.

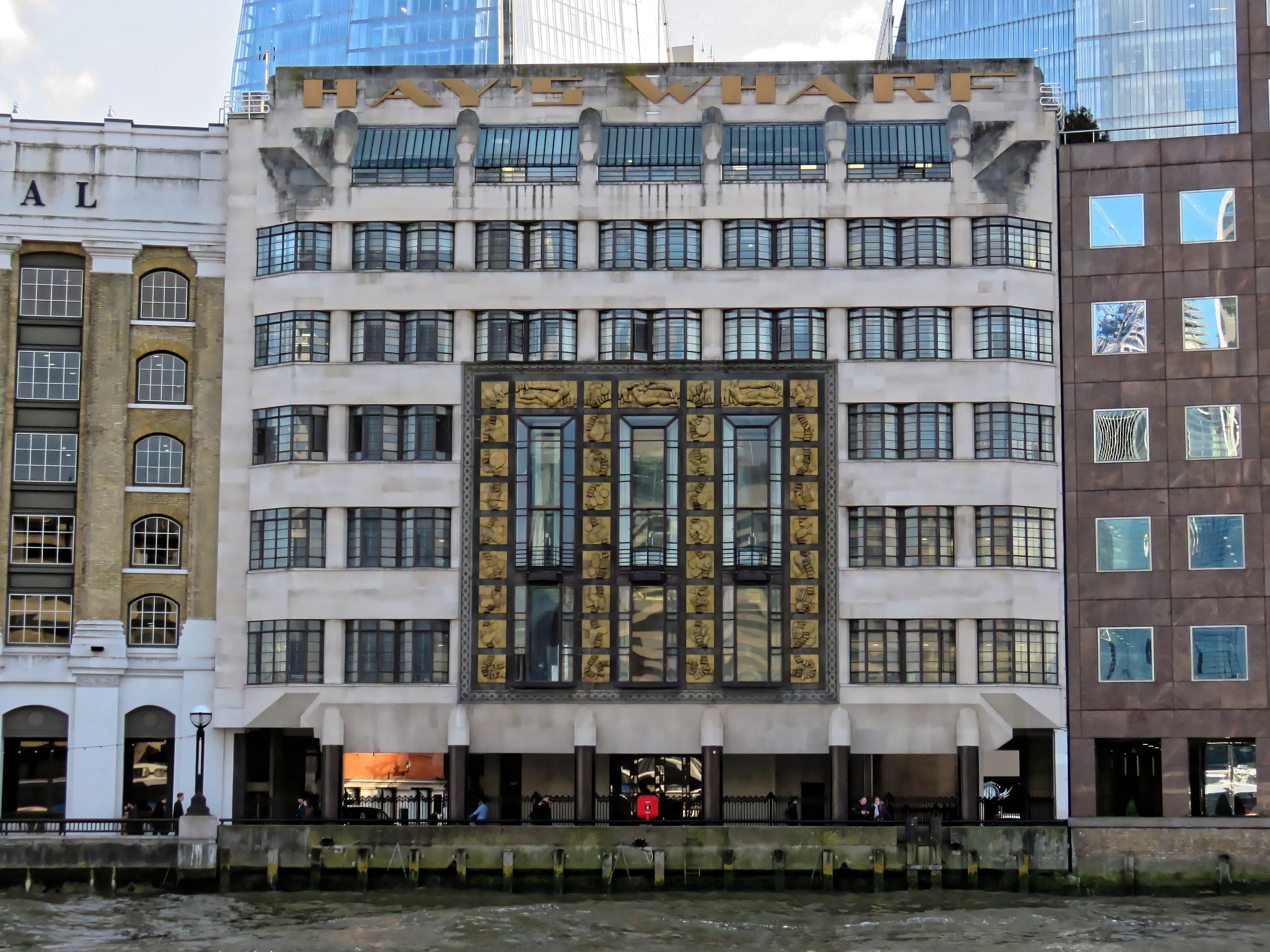
North face of St Olaf House

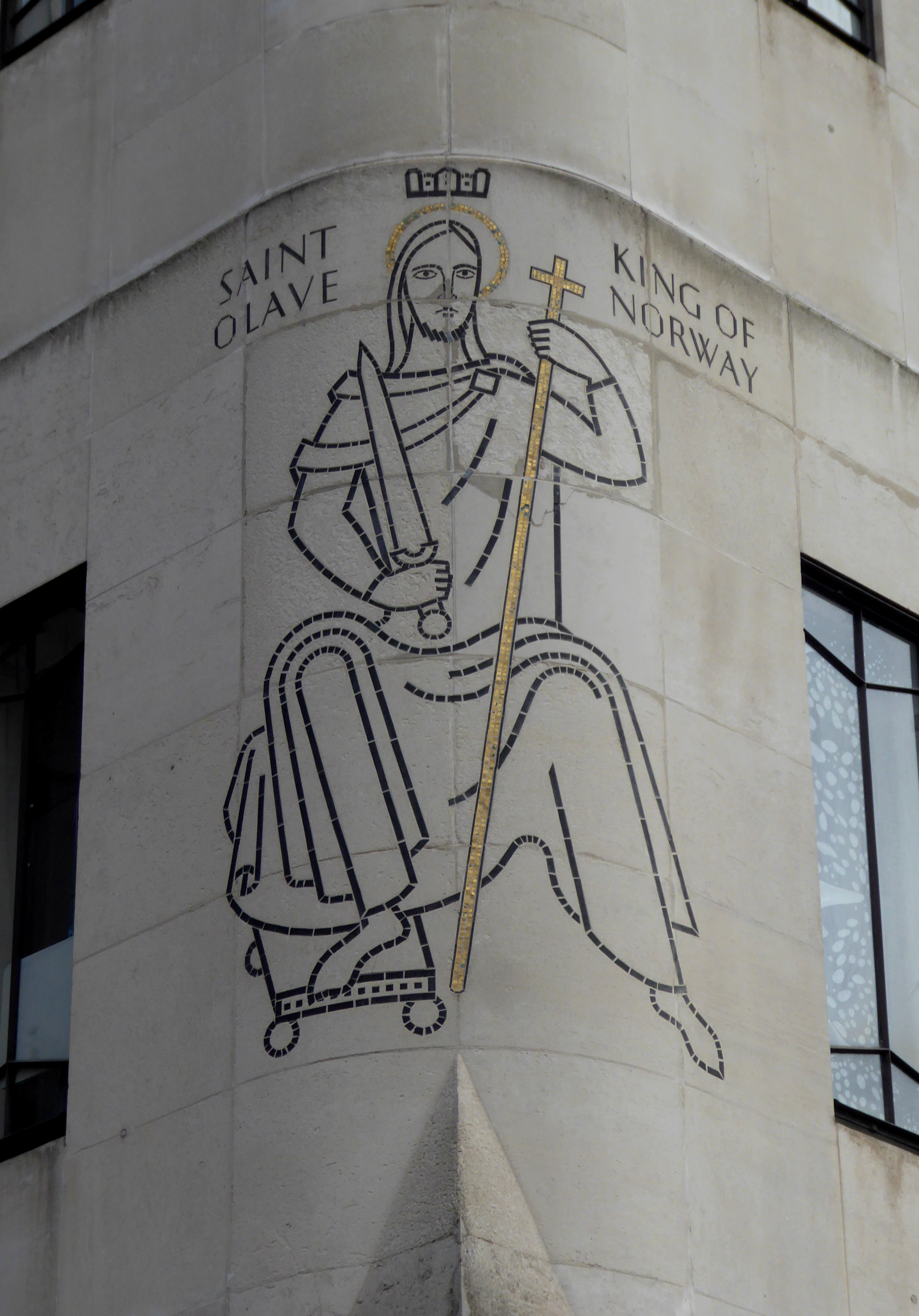
Depiction of Saint Olave on the southwest corner of St Olaf House

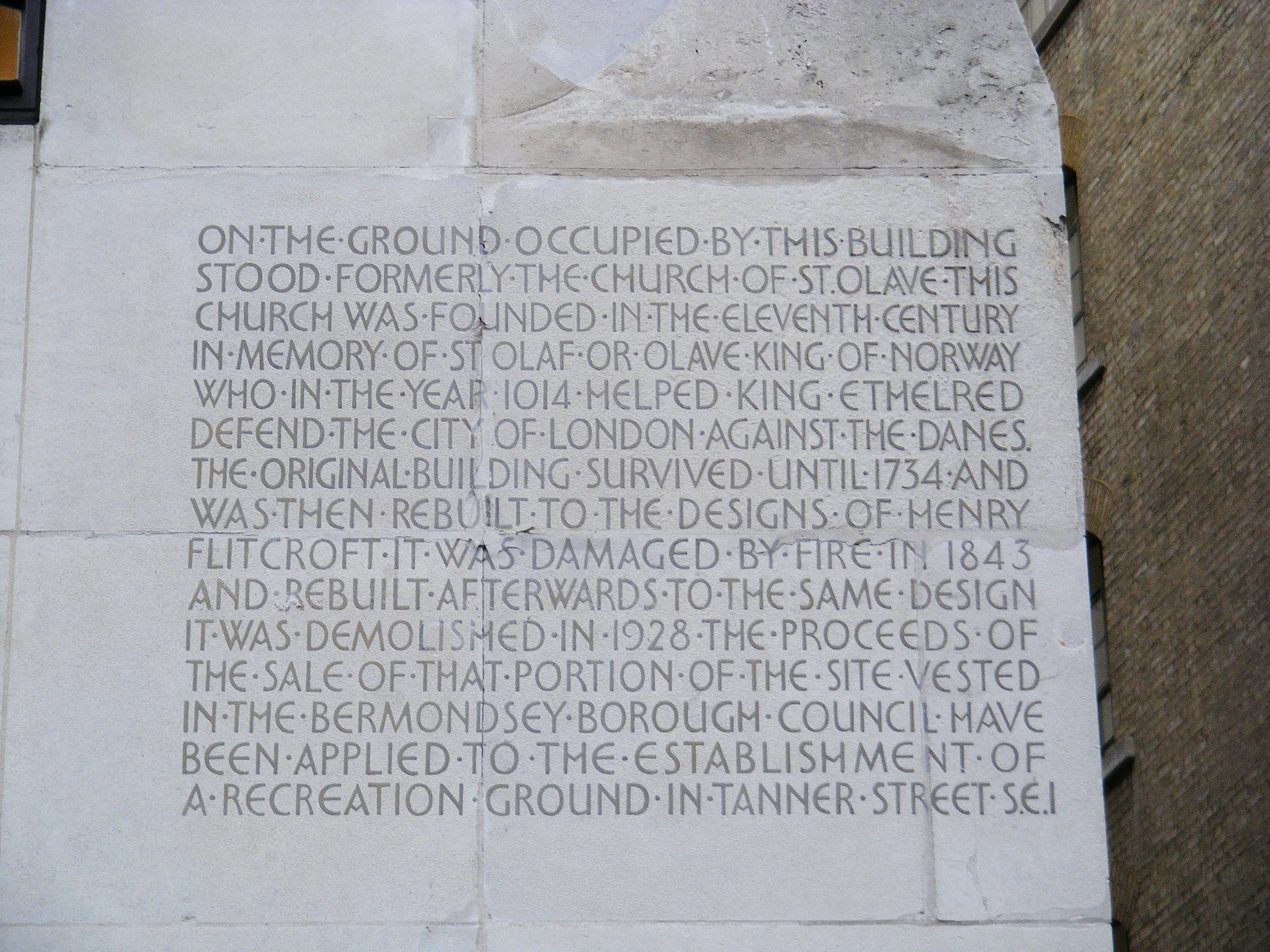
Inscription
