= Mungo Murray (clergyman) =

Scottish clergyman

- Born: October 12, 1599
- Died: 1670; Wells, Norfolk
- Education: University of St Andrews
- Occupation: Clergyman

Mungo Murray (1599-1670) was a Scottish scholar and clergyman. He was Gresham College Professor of Astronomy from 1637 to 1641, Rector of Wells, Norfolk from 1638 to 1670, and in 1661 was elected as one of the original fellows of the Royal Society.

== Life ==
Murray was born in Ochtertyre, Perthshire, on 12 October 1599, the son of William Murray. He studied at St Leonard's College, University of St Andrews from 1614 to 1617, and graduated as Master of Arts (MA). He was a regent (lecturer) at St Leonards from 1625 to 1635. In 1635, Murray took an MA at the University of Oxford by incorporation, under the latinised name Kentigern Moravius.

He was ordained in 1636 and then from 1637 to 1641 was Professor of Astronomy at Gresham College, in London. He vacated the position when he married. In 1638, Murray became Rector of Wells, where he spent the rest of his life.. Murray was elected to the Royal Society in September 1661. Murray bequeathed his library of several thousand books to St Leonards in 1670.

Murray had one daughter who predeceased him. On his death he left £4000 to his nephew, Sir William Murray, 1st baronet of Ochtertyre.
