= Hopton's Almshouses =

Almshouses in London Borough of Southwark, UK

Coordinates: 51.506698°N 0.101527°W

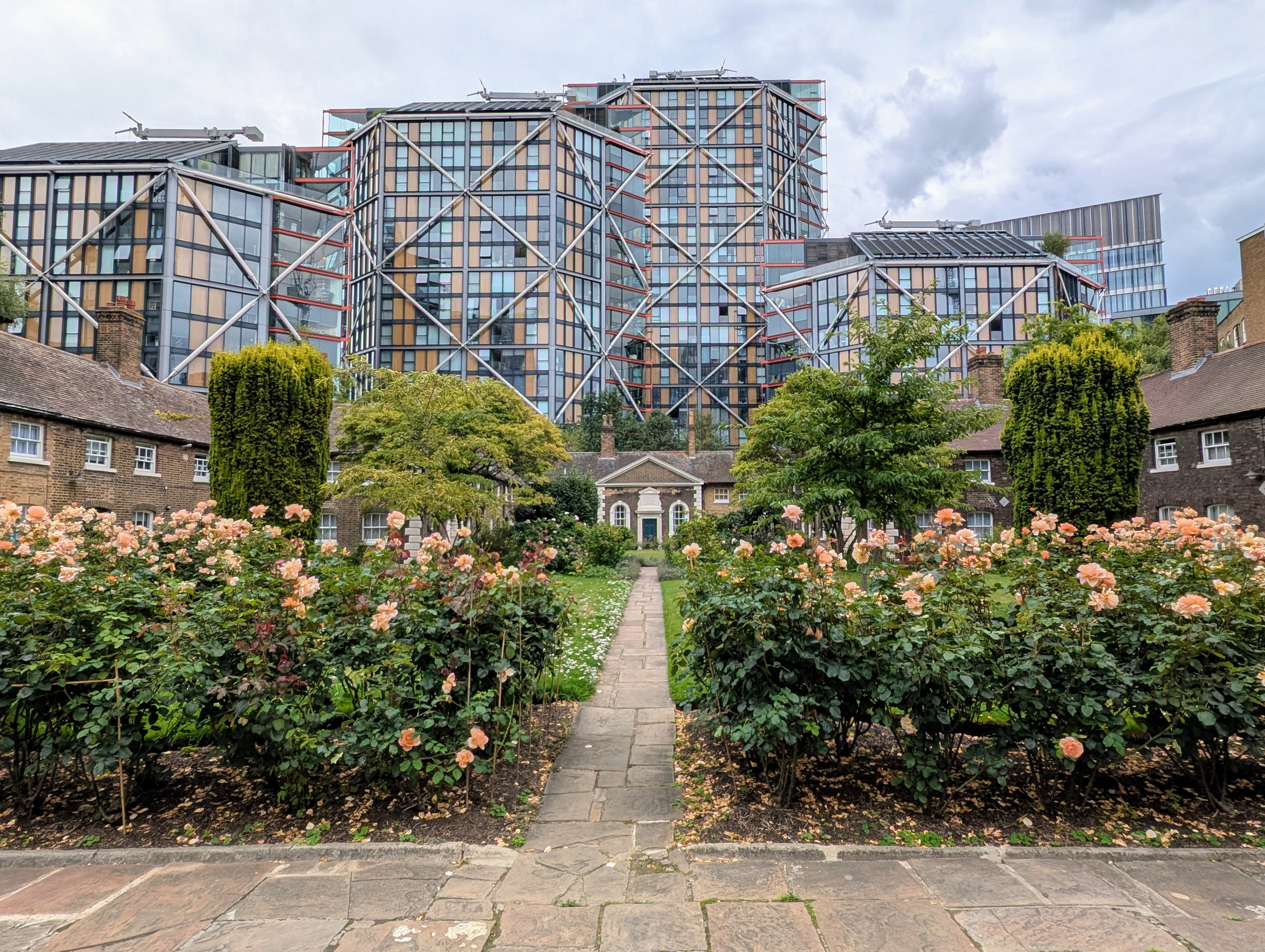
Hopton's Almshouses in 2025 with the Neo Bankside development in the background

Hopton's Almshouses are almshouses and a committee room in Southwark, London, SE1 at Hopton Gardens, 10–11 Hopton Street, all of which are Grade II* listed.

They were built in 1746–49 by Thomas Ellis and William Cooley to the designs of the builder Mr Batterson, trustee of Charles Hopton's will.

Originally built as 26 homes for poor men of Southwark of good character, in particular those from the Parish of Christchurch, Southwark, the buildings were extensively reconfigured in the 1980s and now comprise 20 single bedroom homes for older people from Southwark. The Committee Room is still used by residents and the extensive gardens are an oasis of green in a heavily built up part of London.

The Almshouses were transferred from Hopton's Charity into the management and trusteeship of historic Southwark charity, United St Saviour's Charity in 2012.
