= 1922 London local elections =

Local elections in England

- 1 November 1922

All 1,362 councillors in all 28 metropolitan boroughs
| | First party | Second party |
|---|---|---|
| Party | Municipal Reform | Labour |
| Councils | 22 | 4 |
| Councils +/– | ▲11 | ▼11 |
| Councillors | 1,072 | 259 |

Local elections were held in London on 1 November 1922.

== Electoral arrangements ==
The County of London, outside of the City of London, was divided into 28 metropolitan boroughs. Each borough was divided into a number of multi-member electoral wards.

Councillors were elected to serve a three-year term, to go out of office in 1925. Polling took place on 1 November 1922.

== Results ==
The results for each borough were as follows:

| Borough | Previous control | New control | Municipal Reform (Note: Includes all Conservative Party-aligned candidates who stood as Municipal Reform or another name.) | Labour | Others | Total | Details |
|---|---|---|---|---|---|---|---|
| Battersea | Labour | Labour | 21 | 33 | | 54 | |
| Bermondsey | No overall control | Labour | 11 | 38 | 5 (Note: 5 Progressive) | 54 | |
| Bethnal Green | Labour | No overall control | 15 | 15 | | 30 | |
| Camberwell | Labour | Municipal Reform | 51 | 9 | | 60 | |
| Chelsea | Municipal Reform | Municipal Reform | 36 | | | 36 | |
| Deptford | Labour | No overall control | 18 | 18 | | 36 | |
| Finsbury | Municipal Reform | Municipal Reform | 46 | 4 | 4 (Note: 4 Progressive) | 54 | |
| Fulham | Labour | Municipal Reform | 36 | | | 36 | |
| Greenwich | Labour | Municipal Reform | 18 | 8 | 4 (Note: 4 Progressive) | 30 | |
| Hackney | Labour | Municipal Reform | 60 | | | 60 | |
| Hammersmith | Labour | Municipal Reform | 33 | 3 | | 36 | |
| Hampstead | Municipal Reform | Municipal Reform | 36 | 5 | 1 (Note: 1 Independent) | 42 | |
| Holborn | Municipal Reform | Municipal Reform | 42 | | | 42 | |
| Islington | Labour | Municipal Reform | 49 | 5 | 6 (Note: 6 Progressive) | 60 | |
| Kensington | Municipal Reform | Municipal Reform | 54 | 6 | | 60 | |
| Lambeth | No overall control | Municipal Reform | 54 | | 6 (Note: 6 Progressive) | 60 | |
| Lewisham | Municipal Reform | Municipal Reform | 42 | | | 42 | |
| Paddington | Municipal Reform | Municipal Reform | 60 | | | 60 | |
| Poplar | Labour | Labour | 6 | 36 | | 42 | |
| Shoreditch | Labour | Municipal Reform | 28 | 10 | 4 (Note: 3 Independent Labour, 1 Independent) | 42 | |
| Southwark | Labour | Municipal Reform | 60 | | | 60 | Details |
| Stepney | Labour | Municipal Reform | 33 | 27 | | 60 | |
| St Marylebone | Municipal Reform | Municipal Reform | 50 | 9 | 1 (Note: 1 Independent) | 60 | |
| Stoke Newington | Municipal Reform | Municipal Reform | 30 | | | 30 | |
| St Pancras | Labour | Municipal Reform | 50 | 10 | | 60 | |
| Wandsworth | Municipal Reform | Municipal Reform | 60 | | | 60 | |
| Westminster | Municipal Reform | Municipal Reform | 60 | | | 60 | |
| Woolwich | Labour | Labour | 13 | 23 | | 36 | |
| Total | | | 1,072 | 259 | 31 | 1,362 | |
