= 1928 London local elections =

Local elections in England

- 1 November 1928

All 1,370 councillors in all 28 metropolitan boroughs
	First party	Second party
Party	Municipal Reform	Labour
Councils	19	8
Councils +/–	Steady	Steady
Councillors	916	453

Local elections were held in London on 1 November 1928.

== Electoral arrangements ==
The County of London, outside of the City of London, was divided into 28 metropolitan boroughs. Each borough was divided into a number of multi-member electoral wards.

Councillors were elected to serve a three-year term, to go out of office in 1931.

== Results ==
The results for each borough were as follows:

Borough	Previous control	New control	Municipal Reform (Note: Includes all Conservative Party-aligned candidates who stood as Municipal Reform or another name.)	Labour	Independent	Total	Details
Battersea	Labour	Labour	21	33		54	
Bermondsey	Labour	Labour	6	48		54	
Bethnal Green	Labour	Municipal Reform	30			30	
Camberwell	Municipal Reform	Municipal Reform	38	22		60	
Chelsea	Municipal Reform	Municipal Reform	36			36	
Deptford	Labour	Labour	11	25		36	
Finsbury	Municipal Reform	Labour	27	29		56	
Fulham	Municipal Reform	Municipal Reform	32	8		40	
Greenwich	No overall control	No overall control	15	15		30	
Hackney	Municipal Reform	Municipal Reform	48	12		60	
Hammersmith	Municipal Reform	Municipal Reform	22	14		36	
Hampstead	Municipal Reform	Municipal Reform	42			42	
Holborn	Municipal Reform	Municipal Reform	40	1	1	42	
Islington	Municipal Reform	Municipal Reform	39	21		60	
Kensington	Municipal Reform	Municipal Reform	54	6		60	
Lambeth	Municipal Reform	Municipal Reform	24	21		45	
Lewisham	Municipal Reform	Municipal Reform	45	5		50	
Paddington	Municipal Reform	Municipal Reform	46	14		60	
Poplar	Labour	Labour	6	36		42	
Shoreditch	Labour	Labour	31	11		42	
Southwark	Municipal Reform	Municipal Reform	42	18		60	Details
Stepney	Labour	Labour	19	41		60	
St Marylebone	Municipal Reform	Municipal Reform	51	9		60	
Stoke Newington	Municipal Reform	Municipal Reform	30			30	
St Pancras	Municipal Reform	Municipal Reform	44	16		60	
Wandsworth	Municipal Reform	Municipal Reform	60			60	
Westminster	Municipal Reform	Municipal Reform	60			60	
Woolwich	Labour	Labour	12	33		45	
Total			916	453	1	1,370	
