= 1919 Southwark Borough Council election =

Local election in England

Elections to the Metropolitan Borough of Southwark were held in 1919.

The borough had ten wards which returned between 3 and 9 members.

== Election result ==
Southwark Borough Election Result 1919
Party	Seats	Gains	Losses	Net gain/loss	Seats %	Votes %	Votes	+/−
Labour	30				50.0			
Progressive	22							
Municipal Reform	8							

Preceded by 1912 Southwark Borough election	Southwark local elections	Succeeded by 1922 Southwark Borough election
