= 1925 Southwark Borough Council election =

Local election in England

Elections to the Metropolitan Borough of Southwark were held on Monday 2 November 1925.

The borough council had sixty councillors, all of whom were elected together at triennial elections. The borough was divided into ten wards which returned between 3 and 9 members. In addition to the councillors, the council also included aldermen. Aldermen had a six-year term of office, with 5 seats being filled every three years at the first council meeting after each election.

== Election result ==
Southwark Borough Election Result 1925
Party	Seats	Gains	Losses	Net gain/loss	Seats %	Votes %	Votes	+/−
Ratepayers Association	44	0	16	-16				
Labour	16	16	0	+16				

Preceded by 1922 Southwark Borough election	Southwark local elections	Succeeded by 1928 Southwark Borough election
