= 1934 Southwark Borough Council election =

Local election in England

Elections to the Metropolitan Borough of Southwark were held in 1934.

The borough had ten wards which returned between 3 and 9 members. Labour won all the seats, bar one. This was the last Council until abolition in 1964 that had an opposition councillor.

The Ratepayers Association was an "anti-socialist alliance" which later changed its name to the Municipal Progressives. They should not be confused with Municipal Reform who were the Conservatives.

== Election result ==
Southwark Borough Election Result 1934
Party	Seats	Gains	Losses	Net gain/loss	Seats %	Votes %	Votes	+/−
Labour	59	0	0	+52				
Independent	1	0	0	-1				
Municipal Reform	0	0	0	0	0.0			
Ratepayers Association	0	0	51	-51	0.0			
Communist	0	0	0	0	0.0			
Liberal	0	0	0	0	0.0			

Preceded by 1931 Southwark Borough election	Southwark local elections	Succeeded by 1937 Southwark Borough election
