= Southwark St Saviour =

Historic civil parish in the metropolitan area of London

Coordinates: 51°30′26″N 0°5′40″W

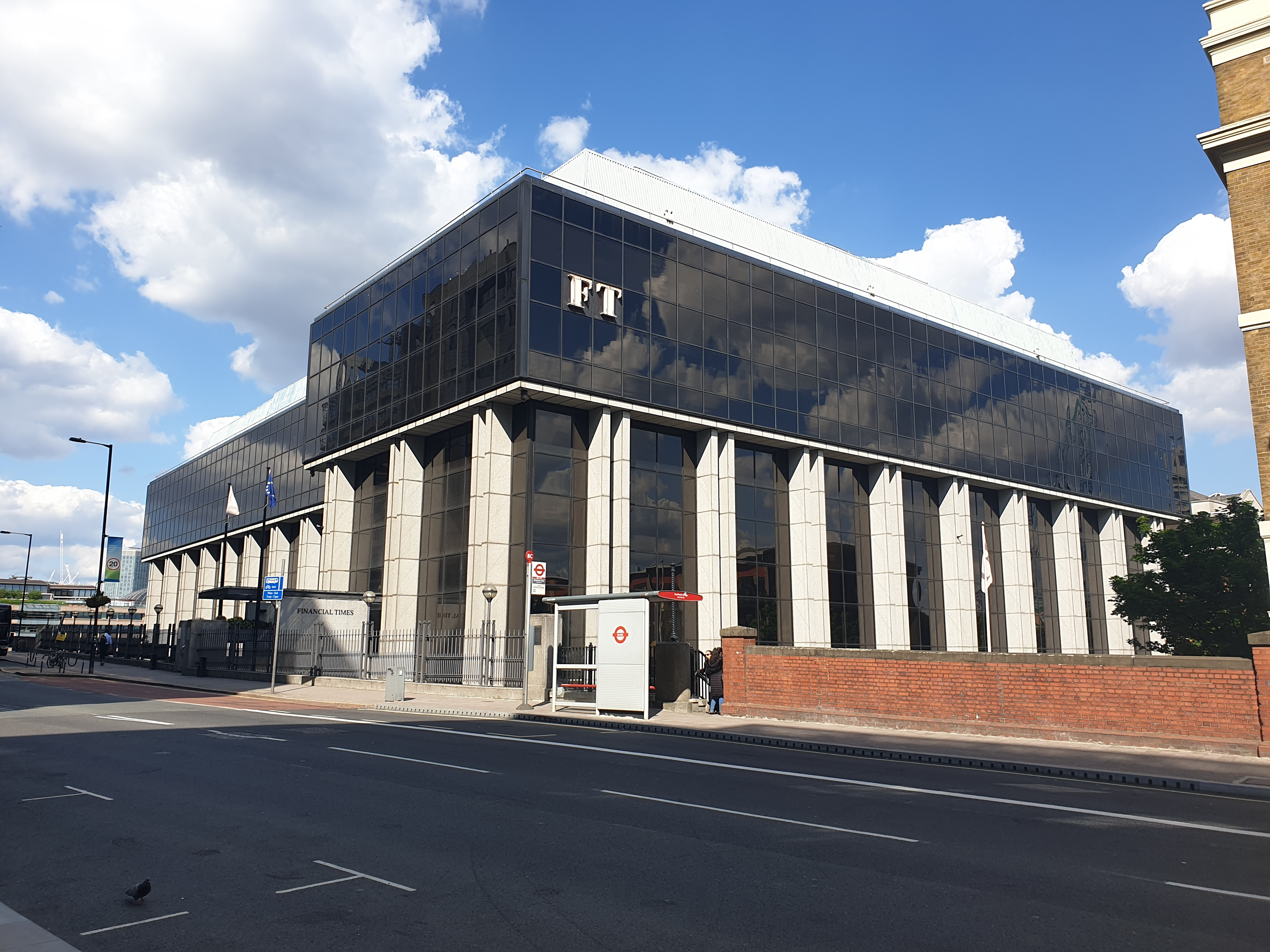

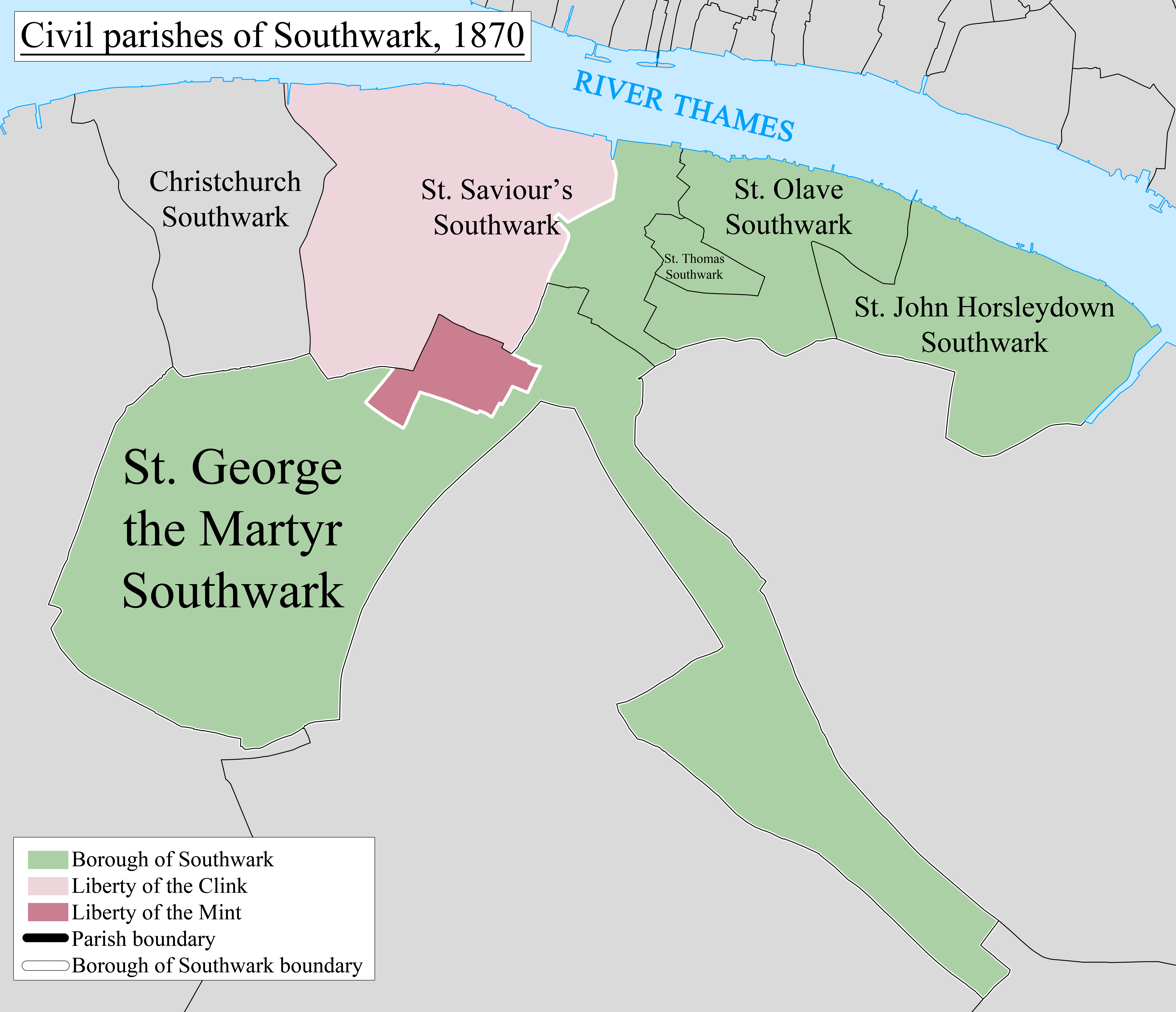
- Area
  - 1881: 127 acres (0.51 km^{2})
  - 1901: 132 acres (0.53 km^{2})
  - 1921: 133 acres (0.54 km^{2})
- Population
  - 1881: 14,999
  - 1901: 12,056
  - 1921: 9,007
- History
  - Origin: St Margaret and St Mary Magdeline
  - Created: 1541
  - Abolished: 1930
- Status: Civil parish
- Government: Corporation of Wardens of St Saviour's Parish

Southwark St Saviour (/ˈsʌðərk/ SUDH-ərk) was a civil parish in the metropolitan area of London, England, and part of the ancient Borough of Southwark. It was formed in 1541 from the union of the parishes of St Margaret and St Mary. It was abolished in 1930, however residents of the former parish receive a rebate against local taxation because of the presence of Borough Market. At the 1921 census (the last before the abolition of the parish), Southwark St Saviour had a population of 9007. It included the Liberty of the Clink which was a special jurisdiction until 1889.

A map showing the St Saviour ward of Southwark Metropolitan Borough as it appeared in 1916.

== Administration ==
It was created in 1541 from the former area of the parish of St Margaret and the smaller parish of St Mary, which covered the precinct of the Southwark Priory. It included the Liberty of the Clink that had been part of St Saviour's parish.

In 1855 it was grouped with Southwark Christchurch into the St Saviour's District of the Metropolis. It became part of the County of London in 1889. The Saviour's District was abolished in 1900 and Southwark St Saviour became part of the Metropolitan Borough of Southwark. On 31 March 1930 the parish was abolished to form Southwark.

The parish was unusual in that its affairs were under the control of the Corporation of Wardens of St Saviour's Parish. The corporation was established by an act of Parliament, the St. Saviour Southwark Act 1540 (32 Hen. 8. c. 64 Pr.), in 1541, replacing the Guild of the Assumption of St Margaret's Church. The London Government Act 1899 (62 & 63 Vict. c. 14) removed governance functions from the body but it retained its charitable purpose. It is still in existence as the United St Saviour's Charity.

== Borough Market ==
The parish contained the large wholesale food market Borough Market. The trustees of the market have been appointed by the parish since 1756. Additionally, any profit from the operation of the market must be repaid to the local authority and used to offset local taxation. This arrangement has outlasted the abolition of the parish in 1930 and council tax payers in the former parish receive a rebate against their Council Tax.

== Geography ==
To the north the parish had a long boundary fronting the River Thames and the City of London. It stretched, in modern terms, to include the whole of the Bankside Power Station in the west and fell just short of London Bridge station in the east. Half of the current site of Guy's Hospital was within the parish, with Great Maze Pond broadly marking the boundary with St Olave. Parts of what is now Newcomen Street, Little Dorrit Court and Southwark Bridge Road broadly marked the irregular southern boundary with St George the Martyr parish. In the west there was a boundary with Southwark Christchurch (formerly the liberty of Paris Garden) that followed, but fell short of, what is now Great Suffolk Street, Sumner Street, and Holland Street.
