= 1931 Southwark Borough Council election =

Local election in England

Elections to the Metropolitan Borough of Southwark were held in 1931.

The borough had ten wards which returned between 3 and 9 members.

== Election result ==
Southwark Borough Election Result 1931
Party	Seats	Gains	Losses	Net gain/loss	Seats %	Votes %	Votes	+/−
Ratepayers Association	51			+39	85.0			
Labour	7			-11	11.7			
Independent	2			+2	3.3			
Tenants Defence Group	0			0	0.0			

Preceded by 1928 Southwark Borough election	Southwark local elections	Succeeded by 1934 Southwark Borough election
