= Southwark St Margaret =

Former parish in Southwark, London, England

Coordinates: 51.504°N 0.091°W

- Ancient parish
- History
  - Abolished: 1541
  - Succeeded by: Southwark St Saviour
- Status: Ancient parish
- Government: Guild of the Assumption of St Margaret's Church
  - HQ: St Margaret's Church
- Contained within
  - Borough: Southwark
  - Hundred: Brixton
  - County: Surrey
  - Country: England
- Today part of: London Borough of Southwark

St Margaret was a parish in the ancient borough of Southwark, located south of the River Thames in the Brixton Hundred of Surrey. It was abolished in 1541 during the Dissolution of the Monasteries and replaced with the parish of St Saviour. The parish church was located on what is now Borough High Street and the area now forms part of the London Borough of Southwark. It was from 1444 governed by the Guild of the Assumption of St Margaret's Church.

== History ==
The parish of St Margaret was located in the Brixton Hundred of Surrey. It included the Liberty of the Clink and the Liberty of Paris Garden.

In 1295 the ancient borough of Southwark was enfranchised and initially consisted of the parish of St Margaret and the parishes of St George the Martyr, St Olave and St Mary.

The parish was abolished in 1541 during the Dissolution of the Monasteries when the Priory of St Mary Overie was dissolved. Its former area was combined with that of the small parish of St Mary, which had covered the precinct of the priory, to form the new parish of St Saviour.

== Governance ==
The parish was unusual in that from 1444 its affairs were under the control of the Guild of the Assumption of St Margaret's Church. The guild was incorporated by letters patent in 1449 with parishioners able to elect two or three wardens. In 1536 the church wardens obtained authority by act of Parliament, the St. Margaret's Southwark Act 1536 (28 Hen. 8. c. 31), for the purposes of enlarging the churchyard. When the parish was replaced by St Saviour in 1541 the guild became the Corporation of Wardens of St Saviour's Parish, an organisation still in existence as the United St Saviour's Charity.

== St Margaret's Church ==
The parish church on St Margaret's Hill (now known as Borough High Street) was granted to the Priory of St Mary Overie by Henry I in the 12th century. It was rebuilt in the 13th century. After being deconsecrated it was converted for use as the Borough Compter and destroyed in the Great Fire of Southwark in 1676. The church was a notable example of the practice of putting on religious plays.
