= Liberty of the Clink =

Former area of Southwark, England

Coordinates: 51°30.4′N 0°05.5′W

Liberty of the Clink Manor of Southwark
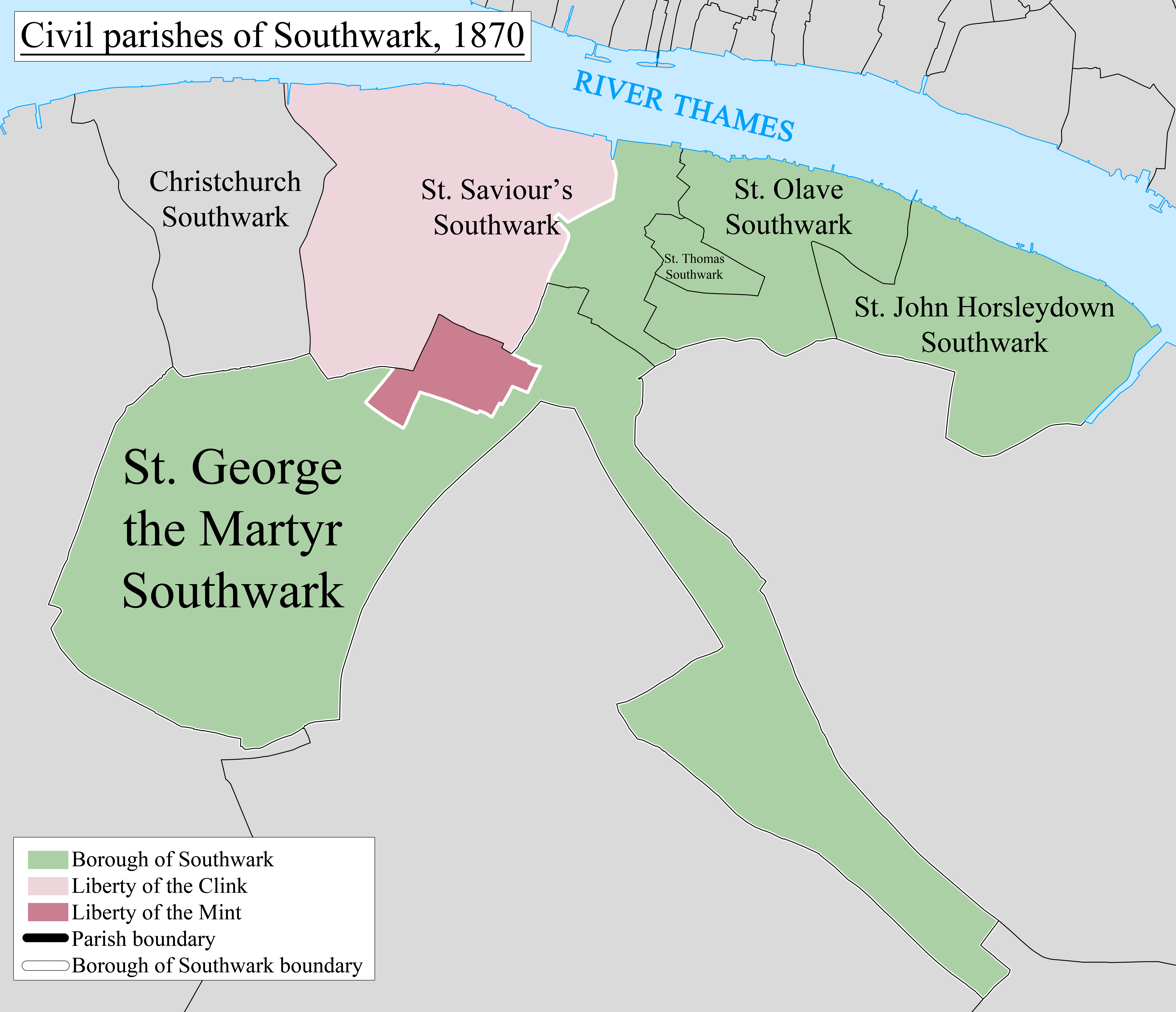
- The pink area represents the Liberty of the Clink
- History
  - Created: 1127
  - Abolished: 1889
  - Succeeded by: County of London
- Status: Liberty, Manor
- Government: Court leet (until c. 1850); Clink Paving Commissioners (1786–1855)

The Liberty of the Clink was an area in Southwark, on the south bank of the River Thames, opposite the City of London. Although situated in Surrey, the liberty was exempt from the jurisdiction of the county's sheriff and was under the jurisdiction of the Bishop of Winchester, who was usually either the Chancellor or Treasurer of the King.

== Formation ==
The liberty was originally the north-eastern part of the 'hide of Southwark' granted by Henry I to the Priory of Bermondsey (Bermondsey Abbey) in 1104–09. The house sold it in around 1149 to Henry of Blois, the Bishop of Winchester and younger brother of King Stephen, who wanted a house for his London governmental duties.

The bishopric's administration referred to it as the Manor of Southwark, i.e., the Manor of the Bishop in Southwark. It was also known as the 'Liberty of Winchester'. The liberty (a manorial jurisdiction) was confirmed when King Stephen sanctioned the transaction.

== Prison and palace ==
The liberty is most famous for its prison, The Clink. The first recorded use of the term Liberty of the Clink was in 1530; the nickname was used informally to avoid confusion with the other manors in Southwark. 'Clink' seems to be derived from the name of the Bishop's prison, which he held as a civil authority deriving from his role as Chancellor or Treasurer. It was also the manorial gaol maintained by the bishop as part of the administration of the liberty. The bishop's London residence, Winchester House, was built in the liberty and was originally surrounded by parkland.

== Illicit activities ==
The liberty lay outside the jurisdiction of the City of London, and that of the county authorities of Surrey, and some activities forbidden in those areas were permitted within it.

In 1161 Bishop Henry of Blois was granted the power to license prostitutes and brothels in the liberty by King Henry II. The prostitutes were known as Winchester Geese, and, by legend, many are buried in Cross Bones, an unconsecrated graveyard. Similarly, to "be bitten by a Winchester goose" meant "to contract a venereal disease".

Theatres and playhouses were allowed in the Clink; the most famous was the Globe Theatre where William Shakespeare performed his plays. Another was The Rose, where Shakespeare and Christopher Marlowe both premiered plays.

Bull and bear baiting were also permitted.

== Local governance ==
The liberty was in the parish of St Margaret's, Southwark until 1539 when it was replaced by St Saviour's, Southwark.

The Southwark (Streets) Act 1786 (26 Geo. 3. c. 120) (long title "An Act for paving, cleansing, lighting and watching the Streets, Lanes and other publick Passages and Places, within the Manor of Southwark, otherwise called The Clink …") established the Clink Paving Commissioners. Bollards marked "Clink 1812", part of the works of the commissioners, can be found in the Bankside area.

As a civic area it was united in the St Saviour's District with St Saviour's and Christchurch, Surrey under the Metropolitan Board of Works from 1855. The metropolitan board assumed the powers of the paving commissioners.

== Abolition ==
During the period of the Commonwealth the episcopy was abolished, and the liberty was sold to a private owner in 1649. It was returned to the bishop on the restoration in 1660.

The Clink prison was destroyed in 1780, and the bishop's palace in 1814. In 1863 the rights of the Bishop of Winchester in the liberty were vested in the Ecclesiastical Commissioners.

The liberty was finally abolished in 1889, when the Local Government Act 1888 merged all remaining liberties into their surrounding counties. The Liberty of the Clink had been surrounded by Surrey, but the 1888 act created a new County of London in the metropolitan area and the liberty became part of the new county.

== Geography ==
The liberty was approximately 70 acres (28 hectares) in area and was situated in the modern Bankside area of the London Borough of Southwark. Clink Street and Winchester Walk recall its former status.
