= United St Saviour's Charity =

Charity in London, England

- United St Saviour's Charity
- Predecessor: Corporation of Wardens of the Parish of St Saviour, Southwark
- Founded: 1541
- Merger of: Hopton's Charity (2012) Helen Peele Charity (2024)
- Type: Nonprofit
- Registration no.: Charity 1103731; Company 5092710
- Legal status: Active
- Purpose: Social Housing and Charitable Grants in London Borough of Southwark
- Professional title: United St Saviour's Charity
- Headquarters: London, SE1 3JW
- Coordinates: 51.502144°N 0.081552°W
- Region served: England and Wales
- Services: Housing, grants, research
- Chief Executive: Martyn Craddock
- Chair of trustees: Stephen Burns
- Key people: Jude Leighton, Alison Benzimra, Will Cole (Exec team members)
- Budget: ▲£3.76m (2023/2024)
- Revenue: ▲£4.02m (2023/2024)
- Endowment: £65.03m (2023/2024)
- Staff: 20 (2024)
- Website: www.ustsc.org.uk

United St Saviour's Charity is a charity in the London Borough of Southwark, London, England. The charity supports the people and communities of Southwark through grant-making programmes, which provides funding to local charities and organisations, as well as providing housing for older people in their almshouses. It was founded as the Corporation of Wardens of the Parish of St Saviour, Southwark in 1541.

== History ==
United St Saviours Charity dates its roots back to 1541, when Henry VIII passed an Act of Parliament to form the Corporation of Wardens of the Parish of St Saviour, Southwark, to administer the affairs of the parish of Southwark St Saviour.

The Act of 1541 provided that the parishioners of the new parish elect six able persons to be church wardens, and carry out all their duties, which would include looking after the poor of the parish and management of the parish estates, including land and money gifted to them by wealthy benefactors. The six wardens had specific roles and titles to go with it, such as Warden of the Great Account, Renter Warden, Bell Warden, and College Warden.

In 1584, the local MP and Warden, Thomas Cure, gave a large amount of land and money to the parish to establish sixteen almshouses as a 'College or Hospital for the Poor'. Thomas Cure has made his wealth by becoming the Master of the Saddle Horses to Edward VI, Mary I, and Elizabeth I. The charity still owns the properties on this land right by Borough Market, and uses the rent from the various commercial pubs, shops, and homes to fund its work. The charity also holds an annual service in Southwark Cathedral to commemorate the life of Thomas Cure.

Over the centuries, many others left money and land to the parish, which included funding almshouses. These gifts still fund the work of the charity today, and in some places, United St Saviour's still owns the land.

The Corporation of Wardens continued in existences for many centuries, acting as trustees of the charities, and heavily involved in Borough Market. In 1900, the corporation had its ecclesiastical role removed, which left only the charitable functions intact, and United St Saviour’s Charity came under the control of the Metropolitan Borough of Southwark. The charity still maintains vestiges to its past through giving honorary titles of the Wardens to Trustees.

The original almshouses in Park Street lasted until 1868 when they were forced to move when the new railway line was built. The inhabitants moved to newly built almshouses in West Norwood. These almshouses were still standing until 2005, when eventually, their age and general poor state of repair prompted a move to Purley, South London, in 2006, where St Saviour’s Court remains today.

In 2012, United St Saviour’s Charity took on custodianship of Hopton’s Almshouses at Bankside. A new almshouse was opened in Southwark Park Road, Bermondsey in 2023 called Appleby Blue, named after Dorothy Appleby (or Applebee), a publican in Borough High St who left gifts to the parish in her will of 1682, and the Blue, Bermondsey.

The charity took control of Hopton's Almshouse Charity in 2012. These Grade 2* buildings were built in 1752, and named after Charles Hopton, a liveryman of the Worshipful Company of Fishmongers who died in 1730

The charity took control of the Helen Peele Memorial Almshouses on Lower Road, Rotherhithe in 2024. These were built in 1905 by Charles John Peele in memory of his mother. The Peele family were connected to the industrialist Brandram family of Rotherhithe.

== Governance ==
United St Saviour's Charity is a registered charity with Charity Commission number 1103731. It is also a registered company with Companies House number 05092710. It was incorporated on 13 May 2004, but updated in 2020. The charity is governed by up to 12 trustees, who are normally connected to Southwark through their work or home. They serve a maximum term of 9 years.

The Board of Trustees meet up to 5 times per year. There are two subcommittees which focus on Community Investment grant making and finances. The head office is based in Crucifix Lane in London.

The charity is corporate trustee to its linked charities United St Saviour's Endowment Charity, Hopton's Charity and Helen Peele Memorial Almshouses Charity.

== Activities ==
United St Saviour’s Charity supports the people and communities of Southwark through community investment and grant making, and providing social housing for older people.

Almshouses

United St Saviour’s Charity has been providing almshouses for older people since the 16th century, driven by the organisation’s core value to provide housing for the people of Southwark. The charity provides 137 homes across four sites, for people older than 65 years of age.

The charity has provided almshouses since the 16th century. The current almshouses include St Saviour’s Court in Purley, Hopton’s Gardens, Appleby Blue, and Helen Peele Memorial Almshouses.

Applebly Blue Almshouse, located in Bermondsey, opened in July 2023. The almshouse consists of 57 homes for people over the age of 65 in Southwark with low incomes. It also hosts a range of community and social activities.

Community Investment

The charity provides grants to other organisations in Southwark through its Community Investment programme. The programme provides small and large grants to organisations that support people in need who live in Southwark.

One Southwark

In 2022, as part of their Community Investment Programme, United St Saviours Charity launched One Southwark, a programme funded by City Bridge Foundation supporting young people in Southwark with financial support, mentoring, and training. It works in collaboration with a coalition of community stakeholders (businesses, funders, charities, and residents).

Research

The charity also has a research and influence focus, developing partnerships with research funders and research institutions. Its main focus is housing and ageing, and the impact on health and wellbeing.
