= 1928 Southwark Borough Council election =

Local election in England

1928 ward boundaries

Elections to the Metropolitan Borough of Southwark were held in 1928.

The borough had ten wards which returned between 3 and 9 members.

== Election summary ==
At the previous elections in 1925 the Ratepayers Association won 44 seats to the Labour Party's 16. The Ratepayers Association was the name adopted for an anti-Labour Party electoral alliance. By 1928 this electoral alliance had ended in two of the ten of wards. In other wards, candidates reverted to running either as Liberals (Progressives) or Municipal Reform (Conservatives).

Southwark Borough Election Result 1928
Party	Seats	Gains	Losses	Net gain/loss	Seats %	Votes %	Votes	+/−
Labour	18	3	1	+2	30.0	10,728	45.6	
Liberal	17	17	0	+17	28.3	5,802	24.7	
Municipal Reform	13	13	0	+13	21.7	3,596	15.3	
Ratepayers	12	0	32	-32	20.0	2,990	12.7	
Unemployed Workers	0	0	0	0	0.0	301	1.3	
Independent Progressive	0	0	0	0	0.0	105	0.4	

== Election result ==
No. 1 St Michael's
Party	Candidate	Votes	%	±%
Liberal	Henry Arthur Dalton	1,385	51.4	−1.6
Liberal	F G Niblett *	1,295		
Liberal	Miss Catherine M Green	1,288		
Liberal	Peter William Wallace	1,263		
Liberal	Frank Thomas Maish	1,227		
Liberal	J G Wood	1,223		
Labour	W Cuss	1,075	39.9	−7.1
Labour	K Day	1,062		
Labour	W O'Brien	1,056		
Labour	J Ammond	1,037		
Labour	C McGovern	1,034		
Labour	J Read	985		
Unemployed Workers	E Rothery	236	8.8	n/a
Unemployed Workers	W Southwell	178		
Unemployed Workers	W Cameron	170		
Unemployed Workers	B Ball	150		
Unemployed Workers	J Dean	125		
Unemployed Workers	A Peck	100		

- Liberal gain 5 from Ratepayers and 1 from Labour

No. 2 St Jude's
Party	Candidate	Votes	%	±%
Liberal	B. Rowe	831	50.2	
Liberal	Frederick Charles Rowe			
Liberal	W. Myers			
Labour	T. Cullen		43.4	
Labour	P. Gallagher			
Labour	H. Gidden			
Independent Progressive	A. Bennett		6.3	n/a

- Liberal gain 3 from Ratepayers

No. 3 St George's
Party	Candidate	Votes	%	±%
Labour			73.7	
Labour				
Labour				
Labour				
Labour				
Labour				
Municipal Reform			26.3	
Municipal Reform				
Municipal Reform				
Municipal Reform				
Municipal Reform				
Municipal Reform				

- No Change

No. 4 Christchurch
Party	Candidate	Votes	%	±%
Municipal Reform	M. Rushen	489	49.6	
Liberal	F. Martin	487		
Municipal Reform	A. Evans			
Municipal Reform	S. Cole			
Municipal Reform	J. Moyle			
Liberal	H. Brockman	453		
Labour	Leonard James Styles	431	43.8	
Labour				
Labour				
Labour				
Labour				
Labour				
Unemployed Workers	J. Brown	65	6.6	n/a
Unemployed Workers				
Unemployed Workers				
Unemployed Workers				
Unemployed Workers				
Unemployed Workers				

- Municipal Reform gain 4 and Liberals 2 from Ratepayers

No. 5 St Saviour
Party	Candidate	Votes	%	±%
Municipal Reform		792	63.6	
Municipal Reform				
Municipal Reform				
Municipal Reform				
Municipal Reform				
Municipal Reform				
Municipal Reform				
Municipal Reform				
Municipal Reform				
Labour		453	36.4	
Labour				
Labour				
Labour				
Labour				
Labour				
Labour				
Labour				
Labour				

- Municipal Reform gain 9 from Ratepayers

No. 6 St Mary's
Party	Candidate	Votes	%	±%
Liberal	P. McCarthy	1,734	54.1	
Ratepayers				
Ratepayers				
Ratepayers				
Ratepayers				
Ratepayers				
Labour		1,474	45.9	
Labour				
Labour				
Labour				
Labour	Albert Joseph Gates			
Labour				

- Liberal gain 1 from Ratepayers

No. 7 St Paul's
Party	Candidate	Votes	%	±%
Liberal	William Westcott	1,928		
Liberal	L. Want			
Liberal	A. Bodenham			
Liberal	F. Dupree			
Liberal	D. Shadbolt			
Liberal	T. Willers			
Labour		857	30.8	
Labour				
Labour				
Labour				
Labour				
Labour				

- Liberal gain 6 from Ratepayers

No. 8 St Peter's
Party	Candidate	Votes	%	±%
Labour	H. Aldridge	1,974	58.5	
Labour				
Labour				
Labour				
Labour				
Labour		1,909		
Liberal	W. Bremer	738	21.9	
Liberal				
Municipal Reform	E. Gledhill	661	19.6	
Liberal				
Liberal				
Municipal Reform				
Municipal Reform				
Municipal Reform				
Liberal				
Municipal Reform				
Liberal				
Municipal Reform				

- Labour gain 3 from Ratepayers

No. 9 St John's
Party	Candidate	Votes	%	±%
Labour	Harry Hinkins	1,679	64.5	
Labour				
Labour				
Labour				
Labour				
Labour				
Municipal Reform	H. Russell	491	18.9	
Municipal Reform				
Municipal Reform				
Municipal Reform				
Municipal Reform				
Municipal Reform		436		
Liberal	H. Betts	433	16.6	
Liberal				
Liberal				
Liberal				
Liberal				
Liberal				

- No Change

No. 10 Trinity
Party	Candidate	Votes	%	±%
Ratepayers	C. Fordham	1,256	58.4	
Ratepayers	J. Davies			
Ratepayers	William Frederick Castle			
Ratepayers	Peter Milne Middleton			
Ratepayers	J. Witham			
Ratepayers	B. Calvert			
Labour	P. Daly	893	41.6	
Labour	F. Foot			
Labour	A. Saunders			
Labour	W. Jones			
Labour	C. Wagner			
Labour	J. Yates			

- No Change

== Notes ==
Preceded by 1925 Southwark Borough election	Southwark local elections	Succeeded by 1931 Southwark Borough election
