= 1922 Southwark Borough Council election =

Local election in England

Elections to the Metropolitan Borough of Southwark were held in 1922.

The borough had ten wards which returned between 3 and 9 members.

== Election result ==
Southwark Borough Election Result 1922
Party	Seats	Gains	Losses	Net gain/loss	Seats %	Votes %	Votes	+/−
Ratepayers Association	60	60	0	+60	100.0			
Labour	0	0	30	-30	0.0			

Preceded by 1919 Southwark Borough election	Southwark local elections	Succeeded by 1925 Southwark Borough election
