= Borough Compter =

Prison in London, England (demolished 1855)

Coordinates: 51.5044°N 0.0908°W

The Borough Compter was a small compter or prison initially located in Southwark High Street but moved to nearby Tooley Street in 1717, where it stood until demolished until 1855. It took its name from 'The Borough', a historic name for the Southwark area of London on the south side of the River Thames from the City of London. This replaced a lock-up as part of the city's court house under the jurisdiction of the Lord Mayor and Court of Aldermen of the city, and their High-Bailiff of Southwark. This first court house was converted from the old church of the parish St Margaret. A floor was made across the level of the church's gallery and the windows below that were blocked in, the Court Room being on the first floor. This structure was destroyed in the Great Fire of Southwark in 1676.

When the first Compter burned down a replacement court room was built on the site and was in use from 1685. Its front was adorned with a statue of James II, just after his accession, the city's coat of arms and the Bridge House Mark. The court room was on the first floor, the ground floor was leased out as a tavern, 'The King's Arms'. The site is located at the fork junction of Borough High Street and Southwark Street, occupied now by the building which is named 'Town Hall Chambers' being licensed premises at the ground floor and apartments above. It is commemorated by the alley-way behind named Counter Court, i.e. 'Compter Court'.

The 'lock-up' or Compter was replaced by a new building off Mill Lane (now Hay's Lane) on the present site of Hay's Galleria hence the name of the small passageway 'Counter Street' (Counter/ Compter). This also held persons committed for trial for felonies and misdemeanors as well as debtors, and others tried and sentenced to imprisonment, but not to hard labour.

Borough Compter was one of the prisons visited and described by prison reformer John Howard who described it as in a deplorable condition: "out of repair and ruinous, without an infirmary and even without bedding; while most of the inmates were poor creatures from the 'Court of Conscience,' who lay there till their debts were paid." Defects in the discipline and management of this prison were strongly criticised by a Committee of the House of Commons in 1829. It finally closed in 1855.

== See also ==
- Compter
