= Walworth Town Hall =

Municipal building in London, England

- Newington Vestry Hall (1865–1900); Southwark Town Hall (1900–1965)
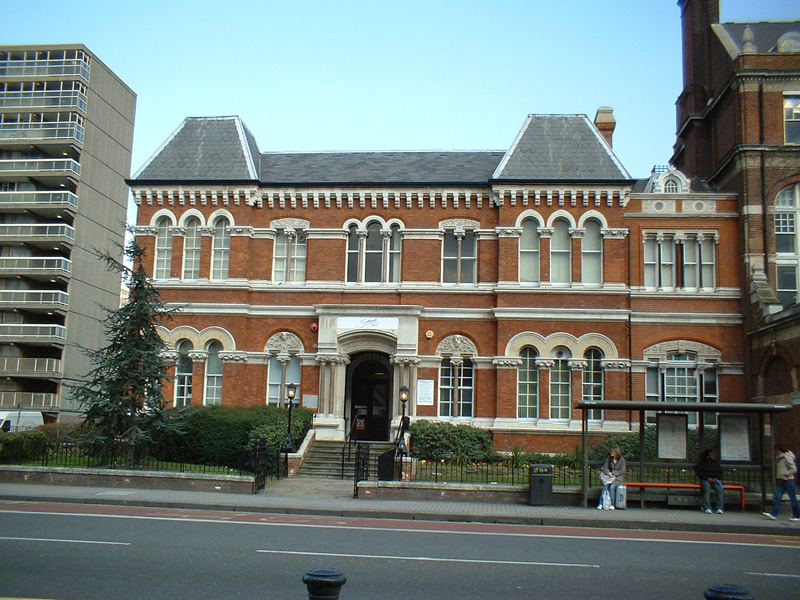
- Walworth Town Hall

- Shown in Southwark
- 51.4910°N 0.0969°W
- Location: Walworth Road, Southwark

History
- Built: 1865

Site notes
- Architect: Henry Jarvis
- Architectural style: Italianate style

Listed Building – Grade II
- Designated: 31 May 1996
- Reference no.: 1386028

Walworth Town Hall is a municipal building in Walworth Road, Southwark, London. It is a Grade II listed building. It was built for the vestry of the parish of Newington, opening as the Newington Vestry Hall in 1865. When Newington became part of the Metropolitan Borough of Southwark in 1900 the building served as Southwark Town Hall. It ceased to be a headquarters of local government in 1965 when the London Borough of Southwark was created.

== History ==
In the late 1850s the Vestry Board of St Mary, Newington met in the Infant School Room in Queen's Head Row as well as in a room in the local parish church. After civic leaders found this arrangement was inadequate, they decided to procure a purpose-built vestry hall: the site selected on Walworth Road had previously been open land owned by the Worshipful Company of Fishmongers.

The new building, which was designed by Henry Jarvis in the Italianate style and built Piper and Wheeler, was officially opened on 8 August 1865. The building was financed by a loan from Edward Chambers Nicholson, a wealthy chemist who had settled locally in his retirement. The design involved a symmetrical main frontage with seven bays facing onto Walworth Road; the central section featured a round-arched stone doorway flanked by Corinthian order columns; there was a triple round-arched window above on the first floor. Internally, the principal room was the council chamber on the first floor. Also of interest is that at the end of this block of buildings, on Larcom Street, Charles Babbage, the Victorian mechanical computer pioneer, was born in 1791 although the original house has been demolished. A blue plaque records his birth.

After the Newington Public Library had been built to the south east of the town hall in 1892, an infill extension was added between the two buildings in 1893. The town hall became the headquarters of the Metropolitan Borough of Southwark and was renamed "Southwark Town Hall" in 1900. It was extended along Wansey street to provide further accommodation in 1902.

The building ceased to be the local seat of government when the enlarged London Borough of Southwark was formed in 1965. It was subsequently used as workspace by the council, becoming known as "Walworth Town Hall", and was also used as the local registrar's office. The Cuming Museum, which had been based at the back of the Newington Public Library, moved into the town hall in 2006.

The roof of the building was badly damaged by a fire in March 2013 and the building was subsequently added to the Heritage at Risk Register. In March 2018, the council announced that the building would be restored and appointed Feix & Merlin as architects and General Projects as the developer for works. Plans were announced in 2019 to introduce a commercial partner. Proposals for the restoration works, which included educational activities, creative workshops and studio spaces, were submitted for planning consent in June 2020. Work began on the building's refurbishment in March 2022.
