= St Saviour's District (Metropolis) =

St Saviour's
- District
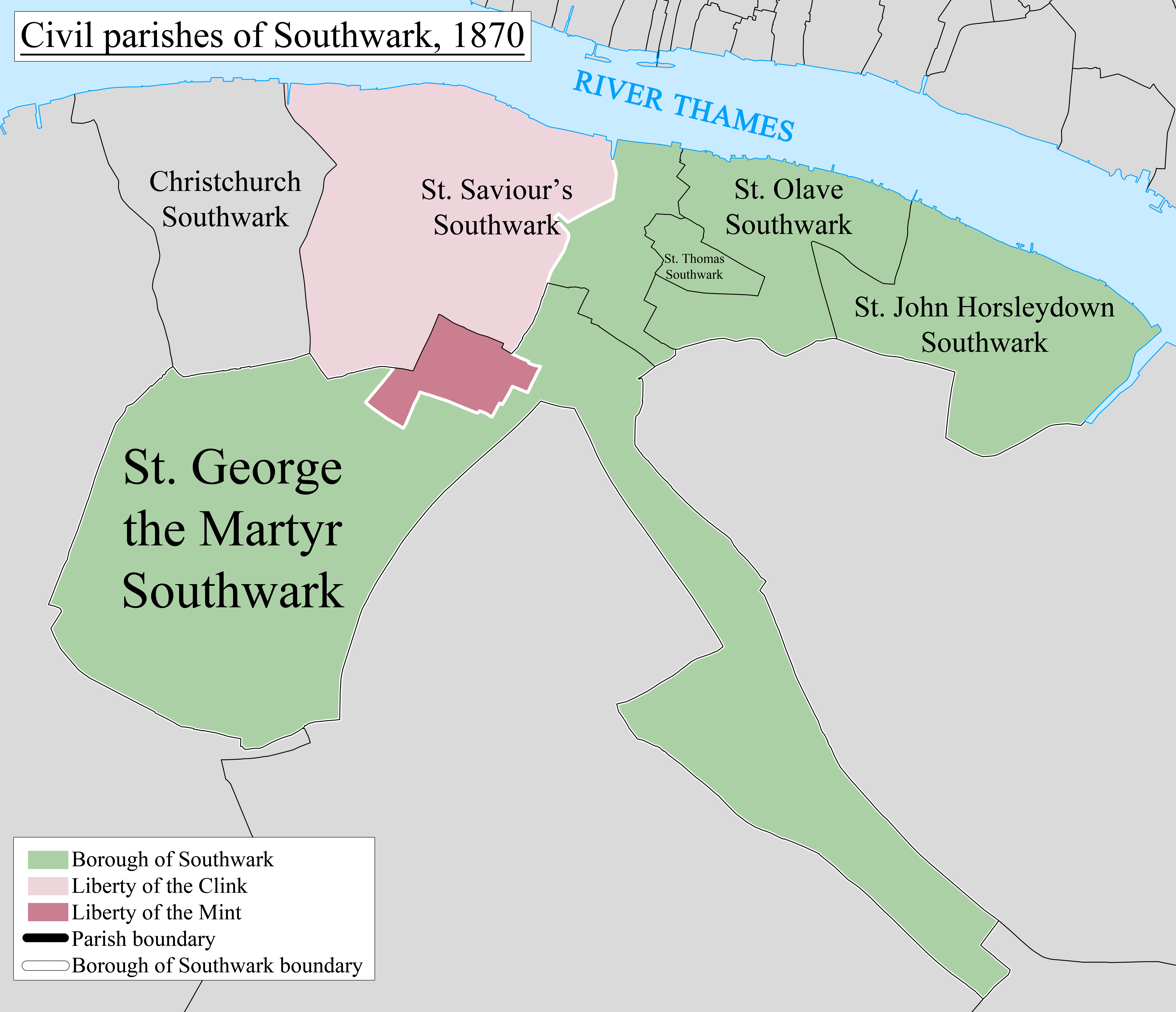
- Area
  - 1896: 204 acres (0.83 km^{2})
- Population
  - 1896: 25,365
- Density
  - 1896: 124.3/acre
- History
  - Created: 1855
  - Abolished: 1900
  - Succeeded by: Metropolitan Borough of Southwark
- Status: District
- Government: St Saviour's District Board of Works
- Subdivisions
  - Type: Parishes
  - Units: Southwark Christchurch; Southwark St Saviours
- Today part of: London Borough of Southwark

St Saviour's was a local government district within the metropolitan area of London, England from 1855 to 1900. It was formed by the Metropolis Management Act 1855 and was governed by the St Saviour's District Board of Works, which consisted of elected vestrymen.

== Geography ==
The district comprised the following civil parishes:

Parish	Area	Population (1896)
Southwark Christchurch	77 acres	12,301
Southwark St Saviour (including the Liberty of the Clink)	126 acres	13,064

Until 1889 the district was in the county of Surrey, but included in the area of the Metropolitan Board of Works (MBW). In 1889 the area of the MBW was constituted as the County of London.

== Governance ==
When the governance of the metropolitan area of London ('the metropolis') was reformed in 1855 the larger parishes were incorporated with new administrative vestries. The smaller parishes were instead grouped (also known as 'united') into districts. The vestries of the smaller parishes were reformed to have only limited functions, including the nomination of members to the main body of local government in those areas, the district boards. The Board of Works of the St Savour's District consisted of 39 members, with 15 nominated by the Christchurch Vestry and 24 by St Saviour's Vestry. The district board nominated one member of the Metropolitan Board of Works, until 1889 when it was replaced by the London County Council with its elected councillors.

== Abolition ==
The district was abolished in 1900 and became the Metropolitan Borough of Southwark.
