= Southwark Christchurch =

Historic parish in London

Coordinates: 51°30′22″N 0°6′19″W

Christchurch Paris Garden
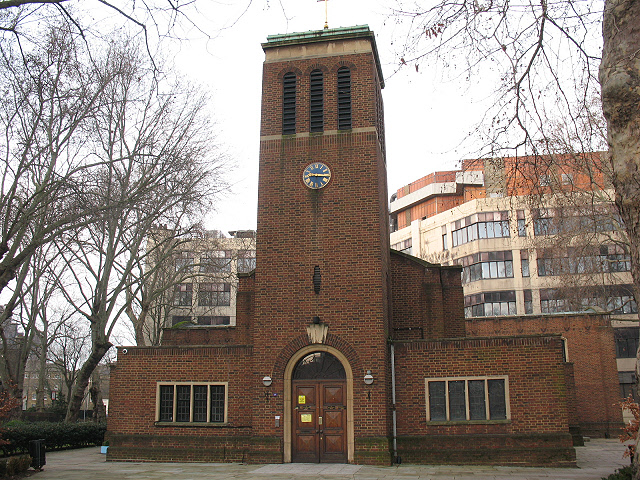

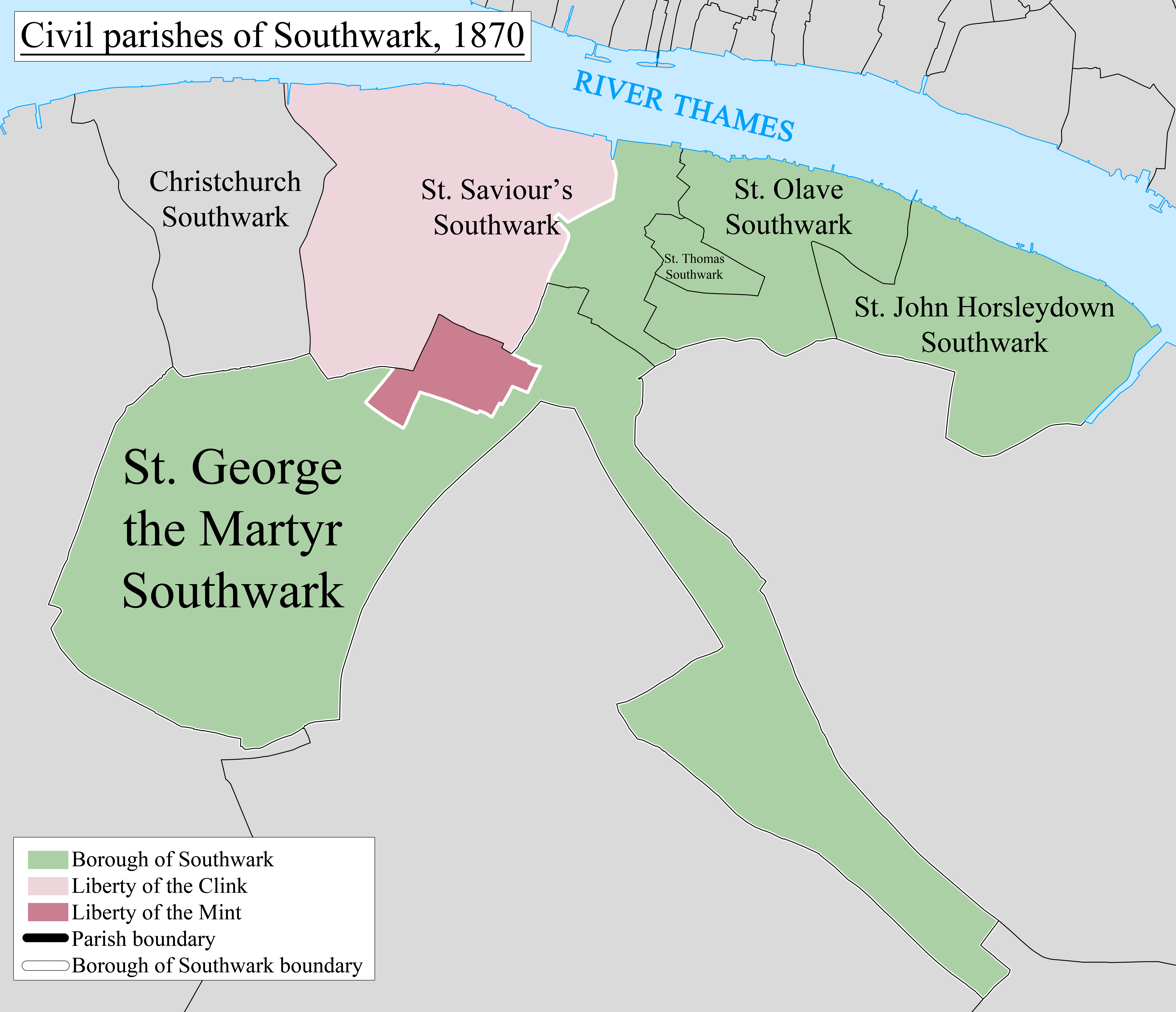
- Area
  - 1881: 77 acres (310,000 m^{2})
  - 1921: 77 acres (310,000 m^{2})
- Population
  - 1881: 13,663
  - 1921: 8,296
- History
  - Origin: Ancient manor
  - Abolished: 1930
  - Succeeded by: Southwark
- Status: Liberty; Civil parish (1670–1930)
- Government: Christchurch Vestry (1670–1900); St Saviour's District Board of Works (1855–1900); Southwark Metropolitan Borough Council (1900–1930)
- Contained within
  - Ancient parish: St Margaret (until 1670)
  - Hundred: Brixton
  - County: Surrey (until 1889); London (1889–1930)
  - Country: England
- Today part of: London Borough of Southwark

Christchurch was a civil parish in the metropolitan area of London, England. It was located south of the River Thames straddling either side of Blackfriars Road. It originated as the manor of Paris Garden in the parish of St Margaret, Southwark. The parish of St Margaret was replaced by St Saviour in 1541 and then in 1670 the area was split off as a parish in its own right when Christ Church was constructed. It was prone to flooding and was not heavily built upon until after 1809. In 1855 the parish was included in the metropolitan area of London where local government was reformed. The parish was united with St Saviour to form part of the St Saviour's District. When the district was abolished in 1900 the parish became part of the Metropolitan Borough of Southwark. It was abolished as a civil parish in 1930. The area now forms the northwestern part of the London Borough of Southwark. At the 1921 census (the last before the abolition of the parish), Southwark Christchurch had a population of 8296.

== Toponymy ==
The area is recorded as Wideflete in 1113. In 1420 the name "Parish Garden" was used.

The street called Paris Garden is the result of a renaming of Brunswick Street in the early 20th century.

== History ==
The manor of Paris Garden was located adjacent to the ancient borough of Southwark, in the Brixton Hundred of the county of Surrey. It formed part of the ancient parish of St Margaret and despite being outside the borough of Southwark was generally considered to form part of "Southwark". The area enjoyed special privilege as a liberty, which helped contribute to the poor reputation of the area. It was possible to avoid arrest within the liberty. In 1541 the parish of St Margaret became the new parish of St Saviour. William Baseley was granted a 21 year lease of the manor in 1542. In 1547 he was licensed to organise bowls, dice and other legally forbidden recreations. Paris Garden became infamous for bear and bull baiting throughout the 16th and 17th centuries. When the City of London extended its authority south of Thames in 1550 the liberties of the Clink and Paris Garden were not part of the new jurisdiction of the ward of Bridge Without. Christ Church was constructed and the area was split off in 1670 as a new parish called Christchurch. The parish was included in the returns of the Bills of mortality from 1671, having previously been included in the returns for St Saviour.

When the Metropolitan Police was established in 1829 the parish was included in the initial Metropolitan Police District. In the 1831 United Kingdom census the parish is listed as being part of Southwark. Following the Reform Act 1832 it was added to the Parliamentary Borough of Southwark. For the administration of the New Poor Law the parish was united with St Saviour as the St Saviour's Union in 1836. The parish was small and, although the population had almost doubled in the first half of the 19th century, it was considered too small to form an administrative unit when local government in the metropolitan area of London was reformed in 1855. The parish came within the new Metropolitan Board of Works area and was joined with the parish of St Saviour (including the Clink) to form the St Saviour's District. Christchurch Vestry nominated 15 members to sit on the Board of Works of the St Saviour's District. The district board in turn nominated one member to sit on the Metropolitan Board of Works.

The parish became part of the newly formed County of London in 1889 and the Metropolitan Board of Works was replaced by the London County Council. In 1895 the Christchurch vestry petitioned the Corporation of London for inclusion (with the parish of St Saviour) within an expanded City of London. In 1897 the vestry of Christchurch joined with that of St John, St Olave and St Thomas to promote a bill in parliament to abolish the St Saviour's and the St Olave's districts and include their former areas within the City of London. The city corporation did not support the bill and it did not pass into law because of considerable opposition. In 1900 Christchurch became part of the Metropolitan Borough of Southwark. Southwark Metropolitan Borough Council replaced the Christchurch Vestry and the St Saviours District Board of Works. The Christchurch parish continued to be used for the election of poor law guardians until this practice ended in 1930. On 31 March 1930 the parish was abolished to form Southwark.

== Geography ==
The northern boundary was in the middle of the River Thames between Old Barge House Stairs and Falcon Dock. When Blackfriars Bridge opened in 1769 the entire bridge was included within the City of London. The rest of the boundary was formed by a looping stream. It was low lying and formed part of the floodplain of the Thames. The area was not heavily built upon until after 1809 when the Surrey and Kent Commissioners for Sewers obtained the legal powers necessary to construct sewers.

Civil parish of Southwark Christchurch 1801-1921

Year	1801	1811	1821	1831	1841	1851	1861	1871	1881	1891	1901	1911	1921
Population	9,933	11,050	13,339	13,705	14,616	16,022	17,069	14,573	13,663	13,264	11,263	9,514	8,296

== Maps ==
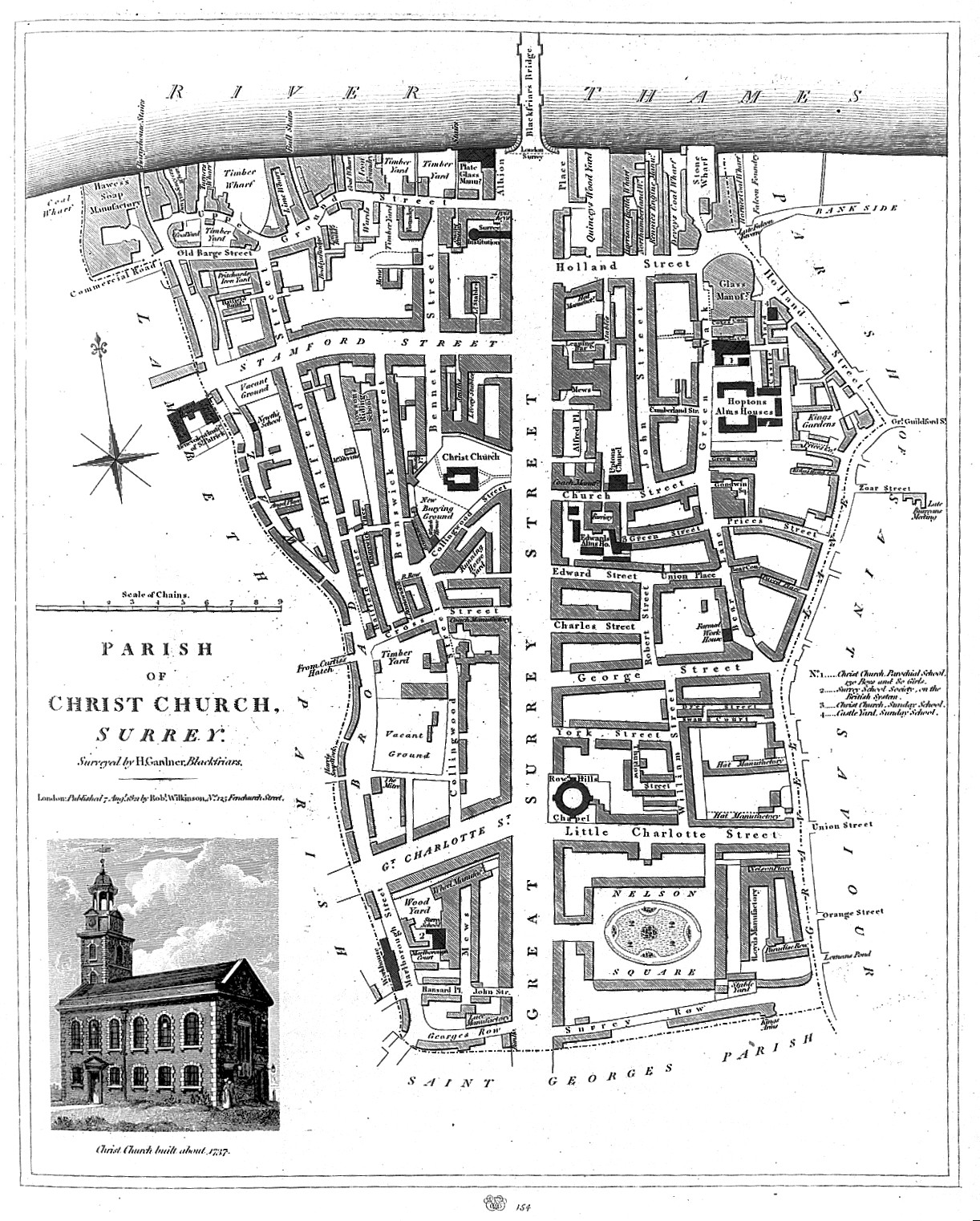
A map of Christchurch, Surrey

A map showing the Christchurch ward of Southwark Metropolitan Borough as it appeared in 1916
