= Southwark Cathedral Merbecke Choir =

English choir

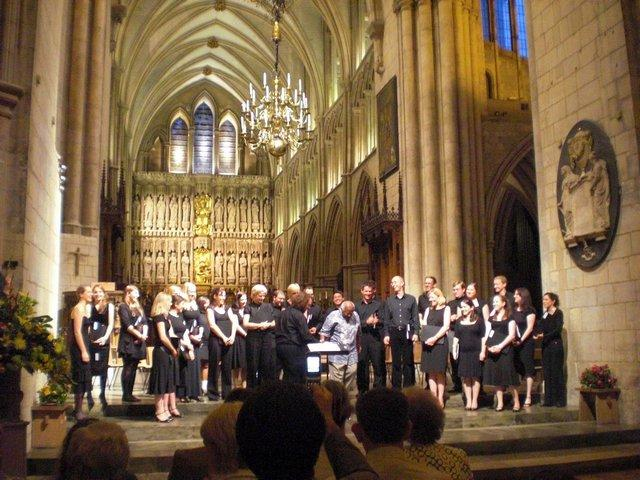
Desmond Tutu joins the Southwark Cathedral Merbecke Choir on stage

The Southwark Cathedral Merbecke Choir was established in late 2003 to provide a choir for ex-cathedral choristers (boys and girls) to continue singing. It also comprises other young singers - often ex-choral scholars from university college choirs and student singers based in London.

The Merbecke Choir is the only amateur chamber choir attached to a London cathedral.

The choir is named after John Merbecke, an English theological writer and musician known for producing a song-noted edition of the 1549 Book of Common Prayer. He was tried and convicted of heresy in the retroquire of Southwark Cathedral in 1543 but received a pardon owing to the intervention of the Bishop of Winchester, Stephen Gardner.

== Role at Southwark Cathedral ==
The Merbecke Choir is part of the music department at Southwark Cathedral and sings at the monthly service of Compline and Eucharistic Devotions during term time. The choir will sing evensong on occasion, and will also perform at a number of special services during the year. It has three concerts regularly each year at Christmas, Passiontide and in the Summer.

== Choir Director ==
The current director is Emily Elias, who took over from Huw Morgan in September 2016.

Morgan combined the post with that of Director of Music at St Laurence's Church, Catford. Formerly, he was Director of Music at All Saints, Blackheath. He has since joined the staff of St Peter's Cathedral Hamilton as Director of Music.

The founding director was Ian Keatley, then organ scholar of Southwark Cathedral. He was succeeded by David Pipe in 2006, who left the post in 2008 to take up the position of Assistant to the Director of Music at York Minster in September 2008, and subsequently Assistant Director of Music in September 2010.

== Repertoire ==
The choir's staple repertoire is early European liturgical music. However, for concerts, the music list is typically expanded to include contemporary compositions - including Huw Morgan's The Word of the Cross and first performances of - inter alia - Michael Bonaventure's Doxology in March 2010 and Ian McQueen's English Requiem in March 2012.

== Notable Performances ==
In December 2006, the Merbecke Choir was broadcast worldwide performing a setting of Ding Dong Merrily On High as the finale to the Queen's televised Christmas message.

In July 2009, the choir gave a concert - "I Sing of a Rose" - in the presence of Archbishop Emeritus Desmond Tutu and Mrs Tutu to commemorate the naming of two new varieties of rose in their honour, and to coincide with the celebrations for the 800th anniversary of the first stone-built London Bridge.

In August 2009, the Merbecke Choir sang for a special choral evensong at Southwark Cathedral to commemorate the 20th anniversary of the Marchioness disaster. The service was recorded by the BBC and extracts of the music were broadcast on BBC One on 13 October 2009 in a programme titled "The Marchioness: A Survivor's Story" presented by Jonathan Phang.

In October 2009, the choir performed for the Archbishop of Canterbury, when he delivered the annual Operation Noah lecture on "The Climate Crisis: A Christian Response".

In March 2011, the choir toured to France, performing in Rouen Cathedral and Église de la Madeleine in Paris on the Feast of the Annunciation of the Blessed Virgin Mary, before concluding with a home concert in Southwark Cathedral. The tour commemorated the 400th anniversary of the death of Tomás Luis de Victoria, one of the great composers of the Renaissance, with a performance of his late masterpiece, the Missa Pro Defunctis of 1608.

Since 2011, the choir has sung Crisis's annual carol service in the presence of Princess Alexandra, The Honourable Lady Ogilvy, the patron of the charity.
