= Hundred of Brixton =

Historic area of London

Brixton
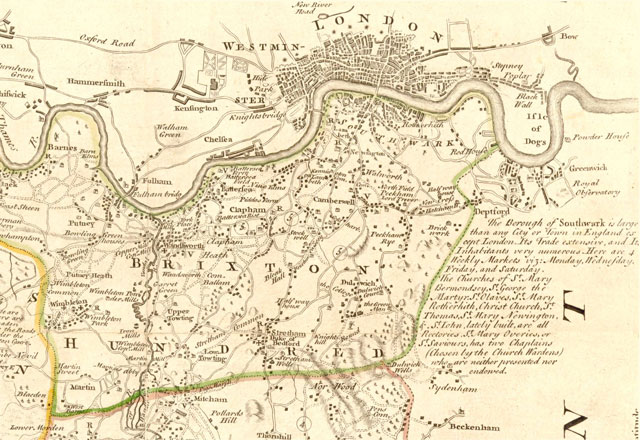
- Brixton Hundred from an engraving by Eman Bowen, c.1760
- Area
  - 1831: 30,400 acres (123 km^{2})
  - 1887: 29,714 acres (120 km^{2})
- Population
  - 1861: 409,504
  - 1887: 825,155
- History
  - Created: in antiquity
  - Abolished: 1889
  - Succeeded by: various, see text
- Status: hundred
  - HQ: Brixton
- Subdivisions
  - Type: Parishes
  - Units: Barnes; Battersea; Bermondsey; Camberwell; Clapham; Hatcham; Lambeth; Merton; Mortlake; Newington; Penge; Putney; Rotherhithe; Southwark Christchurch; Southwark St George; Southwark St John; Southwark St Margaret; Southwark St Mary; Southwark St Olave; Southwark St Saviour; Southwark St Thomas; Streatham; Tooting Graveney; Wandsworth; Wimbledon

Brixton Hundred or the Hundred of Brixton was for many centuries a group of parishes (hundred) used for meetings and taxation of their respective great estates in the north east of the county of Surrey, England. Its area has been entirely absorbed by the growth of London; with its name currently referring to the Brixton district. Its area corresponds to London Boroughs: Southwark, Lambeth, Wandsworth and parts of Lewisham, Merton and Richmond upon Thames.

== History ==
=== Toponymy ===
The name is first recorded as Brixiges stan in 1062, meaning stone of Beorhtsige. His stone may have been where early hundred meetings took place. Gower suggests that it was at the tripoint of Streatham, Clapham and Lambeth parishes. A nearby site on Brixton Hill later hosted the hundred gallows. Brixton Hill had been known in forms similar to Bristowe Causeway long before the modern Brixton was developed. The Surrey House of Correction, now known as Brixton Prison, was opened there in 1820.

=== Geography ===
The northern limit across which lay the City of London and the Ossulstone hundred of Middlesex was the tidal Thames. Within Surrey it was bounded by Wallington hundred to the south and Kingston hundred to the west. In the east was a boundary with the Blackheath hundred of Kent.

In 1831, the hundred occupied 30,400 acres (123 km^{2}). The population in 1861 is recorded as 409,504. In 1887 the hundred is recorded as occupying an area of 29,714 acres (120 km^{2}), with a population of 825,155.

=== Subdivisions ===
The hundred comprised the parishes of Battersea (including the detached part of Penge), Bermondsey (also later its offshoot of Rotherhithe), Camberwell, Lambeth, Newington, Streatham, Barnes, Merton, Mortlake (also later Wimbledon and Putney), Tooting Graveney and Wandsworth. It included that part of Deptford that was known as Hatcham, a manor and c. 1800 a chapelry.

In 1851 the hundred is recorded as having the following divisions:

- Eastern division of 22,186 acres (90 km^{2}) and a population of 314,815 comprising Bermondsey, Camberwell, Clapham, Hatcham, Lambeth, Newington, Penge, Rotherhithe and Streatham
- Western division of 7,699 acres (31 km^{2}) and a population of 9,552 comprising Barnes, Battersea, Merton, Mortlake, Putney, Tooting Graveney, Wandsworth and Wimbledon.

Within the hundred was the ancient borough of Southwark, enfranchised in 1295, which initially consisted of the parishes of St George the Martyr, St Olave, St Margaret and St Mary.

=== Reform and replacement ===
The hundreds of England declined in administrative use because of the rise of various ad hoc boards. Most of the hundred (except Barnes, Merton, Mortlake and Wimbledon) was included in 1829 in the Metropolitan Police District by the Metropolitan Police Act 1829 and in 1840 the rest of the hundred was included by the Metropolitan Police Act 1839. In 1855, most of the hundred (except Barnes, Merton, Mortlake and Wimbledon) was included in the area of responsibility of the Metropolitan Board of Works by the Metropolis Management Act 1855. The hundred fell into almost total disuse when the area (except Barnes, Merton, Mortlake and Wimbledon) became part of the County of London in 1889. In 1894 and 1900 all local government functions were replaced by a system of uniform districts. In 1965 the whole area became part of Greater London, and the districts were replaced by London boroughs.
