= Southwark St George the Martyr =

Coordinates: 51.4986°N 0.105°W

- Ancient parish
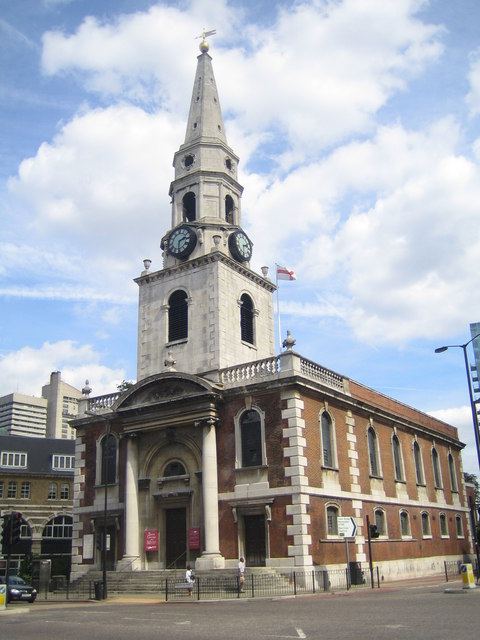

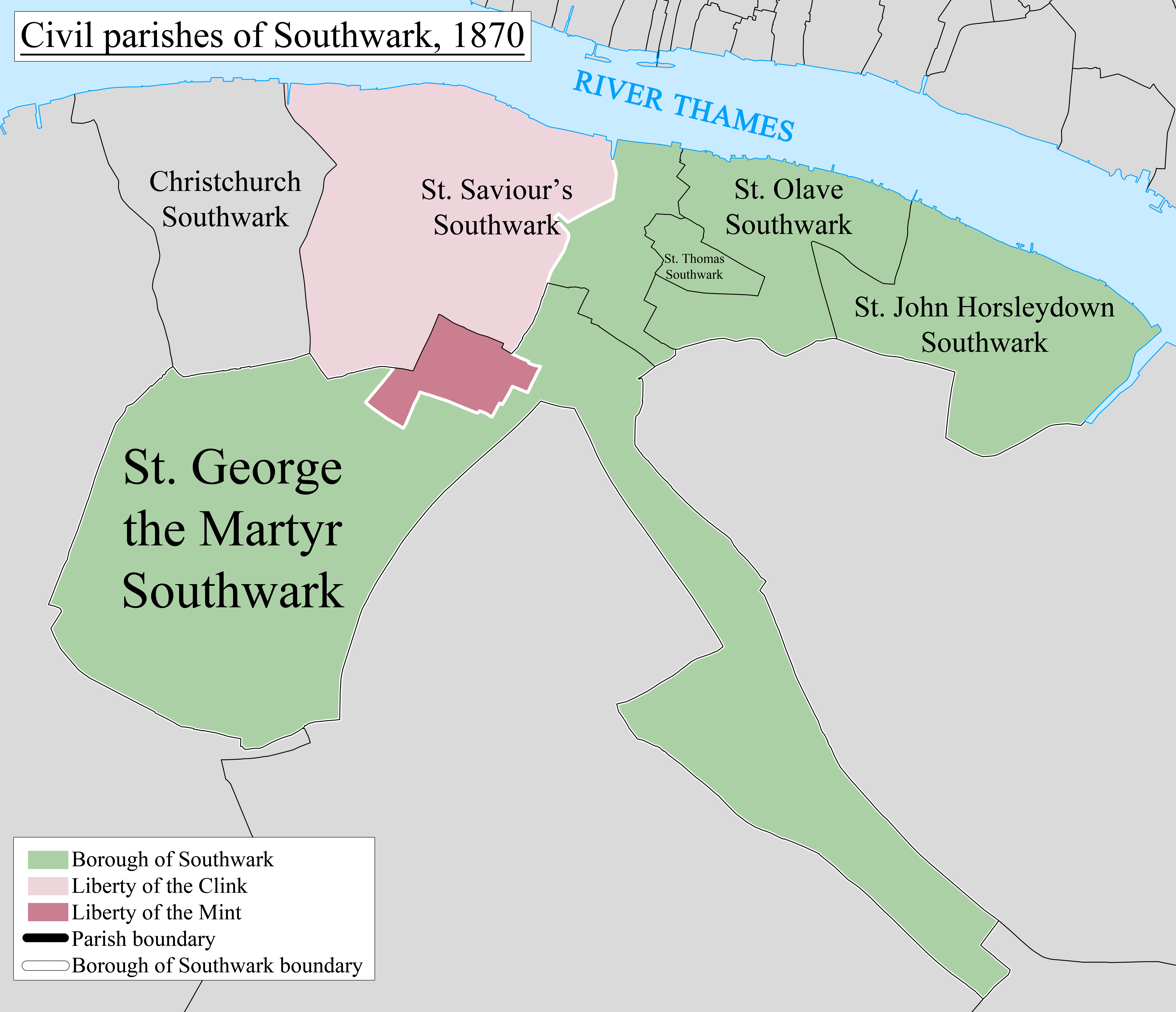
- Area
  - 1881: 284 acres (1.15 km^{2})
- Population
  - 1881: 58,652
- Density
  - 1881: 206/acre
- History
  - Origin: Ancient parish
  - Abolished: 1930
- Status: Civil parish
- Government: Vestry of the Parish of Southwark St George the Martyr (1855—1900)
  - HQ: Vestry Hall, Borough Road
- Today part of: London Borough of Southwark

Southwark St George the Martyr was a civil parish in the metropolitan area of London, England and part of the ancient Borough of Southwark. In 1855 the parish vestry became a local authority within the area of responsibility of the Metropolitan Board of Works. It became part of the Metropolitan Borough of Southwark in 1900 and was abolished as a civil parish in 1930. At the 1921 census (the last before the abolition of the parish), Southwark St George the Martyr had a population of 52,114.

== History ==
In 1295 the ancient borough of Southwark was enfranchised and initially consisted of the parishes of St George the Martyr, St Margaret, St Mary and St Olave.

== Geography ==
The bulk of the parish was centred on St George's Circus, with Newington Causeway and Borough High Street forming the eastern boundary. That part of the parish, also known as St George's Fields, was essentially the same as the King's Manor. In the north east it included the church of St George the Martyr Southwark and then formed a long, narrow panhandle along the Old Kent Road, terminating at what is now Burgess Park and surrounding the triangular parish of Newington on two sides. It comprised 284 acres (1.15 km^{2}) and had a population in 1881 of 59,712.

A map showing the St George the Martyr wards of Southwark Metropolitan Borough as they appeared in 1916.

== Governance ==
In 1855 the parish vestry became a local authority within the area of responsibility of the Metropolitan Board of Works.

Under the Metropolis Management Act 1855 any parish that exceeded 2,000 ratepayers was to be divided into wards; as such the incorporated vestry of St George the Martyr was divided into three wards (electing vestrymen): No. 1 or St Michael (18), No. 2 or St Paul (15) and No. 3 or St George (15).

It became part of the Metropolitan Borough of Southwark in 1900 and the vestry was abolished, replaced by the Southwark Metropolitan Borough Council. The civil parish was abolished on 31 March 1930 to form Southwark.

== Ecclesiastical parish ==
The ancient parish, dedicated to St George, was in the Diocese of Winchester until 1877, then the Diocese of Rochester until 1905, and then finally in the Diocese of Southwark. From 1843, as housing increased and moreover the population of Southwark St George the Martyr increased rapidly, six small parishes taking over most of its population were created:

- St Mary Magdalene, Southwark in 1843
- St Jude, Southwark in 1850
- St Stephen, Southwark in 1853
- St Paul, Southwark in 1858
- St Michael and All Angels, Southwark in 1867
- St Alphege, Southwark in 1872
