= Metropolitan Borough of Southwark =

Coordinates: 51.4908°N 0.0970°W

Southwark
- Metropolitan borough
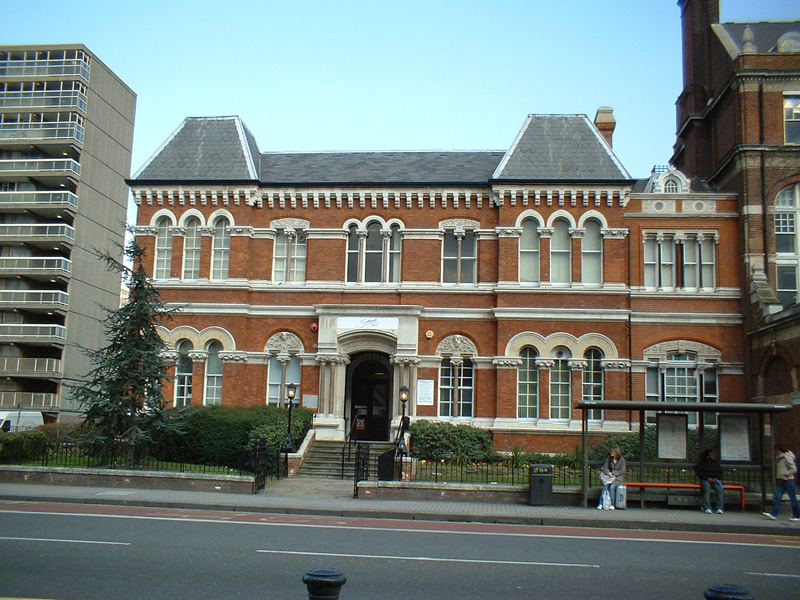
- Southwark Town Hall, Walworth Road was the headquarters of the metropolitan borough

- Southwark within the County of London
- Area
  - 1911/1931: 1,132 acres (4.58 km^{2})
  - 1961: 1,131 acres (4.58 km^{2})
- Population
  - 1911: 191,907
  - 1931: 171,695
  - 1961: 86,249
- Density
  - 1911: 169/acre
  - 1931: 152/acre
  - 1961: 76/acre
- History
  - Origin: Newington St Mary; Southwark Christchurch; Southwark St George the Martyr; Southwark St Saviour
  - Created: 1900
  - Abolished: 1965
  - Succeeded by: London Borough of Southwark
- Status: Metropolitan borough
- Government: Southwark Borough Council
  - HQ: Town Hall, Walworth Road
  - Motto: United to serve
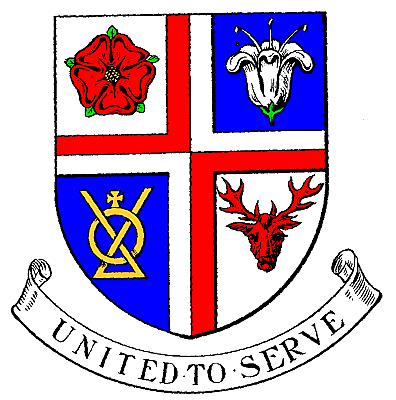
- Coat of arms of the borough council
- Today part of: London Borough of Southwark
- Map of borough boundary

The Metropolitan Borough of Southwark (Br [ˈsʌðɨk]) was a metropolitan borough in the County of London from 1900 to 1965. It was created to cover the western section of the ancient borough of Southwark and the parish of Newington. In common with the rest of inner London, the borough experienced a steady decline in population throughout its existence. The borough council made an unsuccessful attempt to gain city status in 1955. Its former area is now the northwestern part of the current London Borough of Southwark.

== Formation and boundaries ==
The borough was formed from four civil parishes: St Mary Newington, Southwark Christchurch, Southwark St George the Martyr and Southwark St Saviour. In 1930 these four were combined into a single civil parish called Southwark, which was conterminous with the metropolitan borough.

Previous to the borough's formation it had been administered by three separate local bodies: St Saviours District Board of Works, Newington Vestry and Southwark St George the Martyr Vestry.

The borough was one of two created in the Southwark area by the London Government Act 1899. The remaining, eastern, part of Southwark (the parishes of St John Horsleydown and St Olave & St Thomas) was combined with Bermondsey and Rotherhithe.

The existing boundaries were found to be "very unsatisfactory". Accordingly, they were realigned, for the most part following the centre of roads. Guy's Hospital, which had been divided between three parishes, was entirely taken into the borough.

== History ==
=== Naming issues ===
The legislation did not name the two boroughs. Instead this responsibility was given to the commissioners who were appointed under the act to simplify the boundaries between the new municipalities. Representatives for the various vestries gave their suggestions: St Saviour's District Board suggested "Southwark" for the western borough, denying that the eastern borough had a "co-equal" claim to the name. Representatives of the Collegiate Church of St Saviour supported the district board. It was pointed out that a new diocese was soon to be established with the collegiate church becoming the cathedral. This, it was reasoned, would make the new borough the "City of Southwark".

Newington Vestry believed that the borough should bear their name as they were the "predominant partner" in the merger in terms of population, acreage, rateable value and municipal property, and that the council was likely to be based in their district. The name "Walworth" was also proposed as the area had Roman associations and also appeared in early written histories.

The commissioners originally suggested that "West Southwark" might be acceptable, with the neighbouring borough bearing the name "East Southwark". The vestry of St John Horsleydown proposed naming the boroughs as "Southwark St Saviour's" and "Southwark St Olave's", a suggestion supported by the London County Council. A decision was finally made on 25 January 1900, with the western borough becoming "Southwark" and the eastern borough as Bermondsey.

In 1955 the borough council unsuccessfully petitioned for the grant of city status.

== Geography ==
It included the areas now known as:

- The Borough
- Bankside
- Elephant and Castle
- Newington
- Walworth

== Coat of arms ==
The coat of arms of the borough council were officially granted on 14 June 1902. They included emblems of the four constituent parishes. The red rose represents St Saviour's, the white lily Newington, the Southwark Cross commemorates St George (also used by the Bridge House Estates), and the stag's head is for the parish of Christchurch. The motto adopted was 'UNITED TO SERVE'.

== Abolition ==
The London Government Act 1963 abolished both the County of London and the metropolitan boroughs. In their place were created Greater London, which was divided into 32 London Boroughs, formed by the merger of existing authorities. On 1 April 1965 the London Borough of Southwark was formed by the amalgamation of the three metropolitan boroughs of Southwark, Camberwell and Bermondsey.

== Population and area ==
The borough had an area of 1,131 acres (4.6 km^{2}). The population from the census was:

Constituent parishes 1801–1899

Year	1801	1811	1821	1831	1841	1851	1861	1871	1881	1891
Population	62,669	78,219	99,562	116,006	134,225	152,371	173,900	175,049	195,164	202,693

Metropolitan Borough 1900–1961

Year	1901	1911	1921	1931	1941	1951	1961
Population	206,160	191,907	184,404	171,695		97,221	86,249

== Politics ==
A map showing the wards of Southwark Metropolitan Borough as they appeared in 1916.

The borough was divided into ten wards for elections: Christchurch, St George's, St John's, St Jude's, St Mary's, St Michael's, St Paul's, St Peter's, St Saviour and Trinity.

=== Parliament constituency ===
For elections to Parliament, the borough was divided into three constituencies:

- Newington West
- Southwark West
- Walworth

In 1918 the boundaries of the borough's three seats were adjusted and all three were renamed:

- Southwark Central
- Southwark North
- Southwark South East

In 1950 the borough's representation was reduced to one seat:

- Southwark
