= Metropolitan Interments Act 1850 =

Act of the Parliament of the United Kingdom

Metropolitan Interments Act 1850 (Note: Section 78.)
- Act of Parliament
- Parliament of the United Kingdom
- Long title: An Act to make better Provision for the Interment of the Dead in and near the Metropolis.
- Citation: 13 & 14 Vict. c. 52
- Territorial extent: United Kingdom

Dates
- Royal assent: 5 August 1850
- Commencement: 5 August 1850 (Note: The Acts of Parliament (Commencement) Act 1793.)
- Repealed: 1 July 1852
Other legislation
Repealed by	Burial Act 1852

Status: Repealed

Text of statute as originally enacted

The Metropolitan Interments Act 1850 (13 & 14 Vict. c. 52) was an act of the Parliament of the United Kingdom which regulated burials in the metropolitan area of London, England. The legislation directed the General Board of Health to act in the Metropolitan Burial District defined in the act. The board was a public body empowered to purchase eight existing large cemeteries around London and provide a burial service for a wide area. It was based on the recommendations of Edwin Chadwick. Before it was fully implemented, it was repealed by the Burial Act 1852 (15 & 16 Vict. c. 85). Only one cemetery was purchased, that is still in public ownership and now known as Brompton Cemetery.

== Background ==
The issue of burials and the link to disease came to public attention following the 1839 publication of Gatherings from Graveyards by George Walker. As a follow up to the 1842 Report on The Sanitary Condition of the Labouring Population of Great Britain by Edwin Chadwick, which made recommendations for improvements to sanitary conditions, A Supplementary Report on the results of a Special Inquiry into The Practice of Interment in Towns was published in 1843. The General Board of Health had been created by the Public Health Act 1848. The 1848 act was based on Chadwick's recommendations regarding sanitation. The problem of dangerous and inadequate burial grounds was most severe in London. The Metropolitan Interments Act 1850 followed his recommendations on burials.

== Provisions ==
The Metropolitan Burial District was created from the cities of London and Westminster, the borough of Southwark and adjacent parishes listed in schedule A. The General Board of Health was made a body corporate and given powers to enact the legislation.

It was able to buy land, including existing cemeteries, (Note: The legislation authorised the purchase of Highgate, Nunhead, Victoria Park, City of London and Tower Hamlets, West of London and Westminster, South Metropolitan, Kensal Green and Abney Park cemeteries.) to provide burial grounds within and outside the burial district. They could enter into contracts with railway companies to provide carriages to transport bodies and mourners. The board was empowered to lay out the grounds, construct buildings and chapels. They could appoint chaplains. Every burial ground had to include a non-consecrated part. The act prohibited intramural burials.

The board could make recommendations for burials to cease in existing places, including those of churches, chapels, churchyards and burial places in the district. Residents of parishes in the district where burials had been discontinued had the right to be buried in grounds provided by the board. Burials could continue regardless of the provisions of the legislation at St Paul's Cathedral and Westminster Abbey with permission of the monarch.

== Implementation ==
It was estimated it would cost £750,000 (equivalent to £87,293,149 in 2025) to purchase the eight large privately-owned cemeteries around London. Only one cemetery was purchased using the powers of the act, the West of London and Westminster Cemetery, that has remained in public ownership and is now known as Brompton Cemetery.

== Subsequent developments ==
The whole act was repealed by section 1 of the Burial Act 1852 (15 & 16 Vict. c. 85), which came into force 1 July 1852, before it had been fully implemented. The powers of the General Board of Health were reduced to a regulatory role.

== Metropolitan Burial District ==
The area of the Metropolitan Burial District was given in Schedule A of the legislation:

- City of London, including Inner Temple and Middle Temple
- In Middlesex:
- City and Liberties of Westminster
  - St Margaret and St John
  - St Paul Covent Garden
  - St Anne Soho
  - Whitehall Gardens
  - Whitehall
  - Richmond Terrace
  - Close of the Collegiate Church of St Peter
  - St Martin in the Fields
  - St George Hanover Square
  - St James
  - St Mary le Strand (Note: Westminster and Duchy of Lancaster parts)
  - St Clement Danes (Note: Westminster and Duchy of Lancaster parts)
- St Giles in the Fields and St George Bloomsbury
- St Andrew Holborn and St George the Martyr
- Saffron Hill, Hatton Garden, Ely Rents and Ely Place
- Liberty of the Rolls
- St Pancras
- St John Hampstead
- St Marylebone
- Paddington
- Precinct of the Savoy
- St Luke
- Liberty of Glasshouse Yard
- St Sepulchre
- St James Clerkenwell (Note: Including St James and St John)
- St Mary Islington
- St Mary Stoke Newington
- Charterhouse
- St Mary Whitechapel
- Christchurch Spitalfields
- St Leonard Shoreditch
- Liberty of Norton Folgate
- St John Hackney
- St Matthew Bethnal Green
- Mile End Old Town
- Mile End New Town
- St Mary Stratford Bow
- Bromley St Leonard
- All Saints Poplar
- St Anne Limehouse
- Ratcliffe
- St Paul Shadwell
- St George in the East
- St John Wapping
- East Smithfield
- Precinct of St Katharine
- Liberties of the Tower of London
  - Old Artillery Ground
  - Minories
  - Old Tower
  - Tower Within
  - Wellclose
- Kensington
- St Luke Chelsea
- Fulham
- Hammersmith
- Lincoln's Inn
- New Inn
- Grays Inn
- Staple Inn
- Furnival's Inn (Note: Part in Middlesex)
- In Kent:
- St Paul Deptford
- St Nicholas Deptford
- Greenwich
- Woolwich
- Charlton
- Plumstead
- In Surrey:
- Borough of Southwark
  - St George the Martyr
  - St Saviour
  - St John Horsleydown
  - St Olave
  - St Thomas
- Battersea (Note: Not including Penge.)
- Bermondsey
- Camberwell
- Clapham
- Lambeth
- Newington
- Putney
- Rotherhithe
- Streatham
- Tooting
- Wandsworth
- Christchurch
- Liberty of the Clink
- Hatcham (Note: Part of Deptford)

== Bibliography ==
- Cunningham Glen, William (1850). Metropolitan Interments Act: 1850, with Introduction, Notes, and Appendix. Shaw. Archived from the original on 13 February 2009.
