= Burial Act 1857 =

Act of the Parliament of the United Kingdom

Burial Act 1857 (Note: The citation of this act by this short title was authorised by section 1 of, and the first schedule to, the Short Titles Act 1896. Due to the repeal of those provisions it is now authorised by section 19(2) of the Interpretation Act 1978.)
- Act of Parliament
- Parliament of the United Kingdom
- Long title: An Act to amend the Burial Acts.
- Citation: 20 & 21 Vict. c. 81
- Territorial extent: United Kingdom

Dates
- Royal assent: 25 August 1857
- Commencement: 25 August 1857 (Note: The Acts of Parliament (Commencement) Act 1793.)
Other legislation
Amended by	Local Government Ac 1933; London Government Act 1939; National Assistance Act 1948; London Government Act 1963; Local Government Act 1972; Criminal Justice Act 1982; Statute Law (Repeals) Act 1986; Church of England (Miscellaneous Provisions) Measure 2014; Ecclesiastical Jurisdiction and Care of Churches Measure 2018
Relates to	Burial Act 1852; Burial Act 1853; Burial Act 1854; Burial Act 1855

Status: Partially repealed

Text of statute as originally enacted

Revised text of statute as amended

Text of the Burial Act 1857 as in force today (including any amendments) within the United Kingdom, from legislation.gov.uk.

The Burial Act 1857 (20 & 21 Vict. c. 81) is an act of the Parliament of the United Kingdom. It is one of the Burial Acts 1852 to 1885. Its purpose is to regulate burial grounds. It regulates where and how deceased people may be buried, and provides for the exhumation of remains. The act made it illegal to disturb a grave (other than for an officially sanctioned exhumation). The act did not make it illegal to steal a dead body, and it is only the opening of the grave which constitutes an offence, not the removal of the contents.

== Guidance for burial ground managers ==
The Department for Constitutional Affairs provides guidance for burial ground managers, and many aspect of it relate to provisions contained in the Burial Act 1857.

== Disturbing a burial and exhumation ==
Concerns arose that due to pressures of population movement to urban areas during the Industrial revolution that burial graves were reused too quickly. The offence of disturbing a burial included in the Burial Act 1857 was based on the Victorian value that a burial was for eternity. Section 25 of the Burial Act 1857 makes it unlawful in England and Wales to disturb human burials without a licence from the Secretary of State, or on ground consecrated by the rites of the Church of England, without the permission of the church. The mechanisms about how the Church of England provides this permission slightly differs depending if the remains are at a church or cathedral. In Scotland, the law is different and covered by the Burial and Cremations Act (Scotland) Act 2016. The powers for a coroner to permit an exhumation fall outside the scope of the Burial Act 1857 and the Coroners And Justice Act 2009 allows them to authorise an exhumation for the purposes of a post-mortem and in relation to criminal proceedings.

== Viewpoint of licensing authorities on exhumation ==
The Blagdon Cemetery [2002] Court of Arches case is the basis of the Church of England exhumation guidelines. The viewpoint of the Church of England is burial is final and only grants exhumation in exceptional circumstances. The Advisory Panel on the Archaeology of Burials in England is a partnership between Historic England, and the Church of England providing guidance based on the law, archaeological research, and theology. In England and Wales, the Ministry of Justice holds the right to issue exhumation licence. Before issuing a licence, consent is required from close relatives of the deceased, grave owner, and burial authority.

== Modern amendments ==
In 2004, the government, in response to the problem of the lack of space for new burials, partly a consequence of the Burial Act 1857, held a consultation called, “Burial Law and Policy in the 21st Century”. The consultation considered how to address the problem that when a burial ground became full, it generated no income from new burials, and without income, it may become difficult to maintain and fall into neglect.

London burial authorities in some instances could reclaim and reuse a grave after 75 years, under the London Authorities Act 2007. Extending this provision elsewhere in the country was deliberated. The consultation considered the ‘Exclusive Rights for Burial’. When purchasing a grave, a person usually buys the right to exclusively be buried in it for a period, often 100 years, they do not buy the land. Noted was the possibility of reusing graves with the permission of the Church of England. Section 25 of the Burial Act 1857, amended by Section 2 of the Church of England (Miscellaneous Provisions) Measures 2014, permitted the disturbance of graves with Church of England permission. Successive governments have considered the problem of lack of space for graves but not taken any action.

The 2015 amendments to the Burial Act 1857, allowing the Church of England to reuse graves, were controversial. Such changes have been criticised as offensive and distressing to the living, and disrespectful to the dead.
