= Burial Act =

Stock short title used in UK legislation

Burial Act is a stock short title used in the United Kingdom for legislation relating to burials.

== List ==
- Burying in Woollen Acts
- The Burial of Drowned Persons Acts 1808 and 1886

The Burial Acts 1852 to 1885 is the collective title of the following acts:

- The Burial Act 1852 (15 & 16 Vict. c. 85)
- The Burial Act 1853 (16 & 17 Vict. c. 134)
- The Burial Act 1854 (17 & 18 Vict. c. 87)
- The Burial Act 1855 (18 & 19 Vict. c. 128)
- The City of London Burial Act 1857 (20 & 21 Vict. c. 35)
- The Burial Act 1857 (20 & 21 Vict. c. 81)
- The Burial Act 1859 (22 Vict. c. 1)
- The Burial Act 1860 (23 & 24 Vict. c. 64)
- The Burial Act 1862 (25 & 26 Vict. c. 100)
- The Burial Act 1871 (34 & 35 Vict. c. 33)
- The Burial Laws Amendment Act 1880 (43 & 44 Vict. c. 41)
- The Burial and Registration Acts (Doubts Removal) Act 1881 (44 & 45 Vict. c. 2)
- The Burial Boards (Contested Elections) Act 1885 (48 & 49 Vict. c. 21)

The Burial (Ireland) Acts 1824 to 1868 is the collective title of the following Acts:

- The Burial (Ireland) Act 1824 (5 Geo. 4. c. 25)
- The Poor Persons Burial (Ireland) Act 1866 (29 & 30 Vict. c. 38)
- The Burial (Ireland) Act 1868 (31 & 32 Vict. c. 103)

The Burial Grounds (Scotland) Acts 1855 to 1886 was the collective title of the following Acts:

- The Burial Grounds (Scotland) Act 1855 (18 & 19 Vict. c. 68)
- The Burial Grounds (Scotland) Act 1857 (20 & 21 Vict. c. 42)
- The Burial Grounds (Scotland) Amendment Act 1886 (49 & 50 Vict. c. 21)

== See also ==
- List of short titles
