= Burial Act 1852 =

Act of the Parliament of the United Kingdom

Burial Act 1852 (Note: The citation of this act by this short title was authorised by section 5 of, and the second schedule to, the Statute Law Revision Act 1948. Due to the repeal of those provisions, it is now authorised by section 19(2) of the Interpretation Act 1978.)
- Act of Parliament
- Parliament of the United Kingdom
- Long title: An Act to amend the Laws concerning the Burial of the Dead in the Metropolis.
- Citation: 15 & 16 Vict. c. 85
- Territorial extent: United Kingdom

Dates
- Royal assent: 1 July 1852
- Commencement: 1 July 1852 (Note: The Acts of Parliament (Commencement) Act 1793.)
Other legislation
Repeals/revokes	Metropolitan Interments Act 1850
Amended by	Burial Act 1853; Burial Act 1854; Statute Law Revision Act 1892; Local Government Act 1933; National Assistance Act 1948; National Loans Act 1968; Local Government Act 1972

Status: Partially repealed

Text of statute as originally enacted

Text of the Burial Act 1852 as in force today (including any amendments) within the United Kingdom, from legislation.gov.uk.

The Burial Act 1852 (15 & 16 Vict. c. 85) is an act of the Parliament of the United Kingdom which regulated burials in the metropolitan areas of London, England. It repealed the Metropolitan Interments Act 1850 (13 & 14 Vict. c. 52), before it had been fully implemented, and reduced the powers of the General Board of Health to a regulatory role. The act permitted individual or groups of metropolitan vestries (as defined in schedule A) to set up burial boards that would purchase land to provide burial grounds.

== Background ==
The Metropolitan Interments Act 1850 (13 & 14 Vict. c. 52) was based on the work and recommendations of Edwin Chadwick regarding burials. It empowered the General Board of Health as a public burial body that could purchase eight existing large cemeteries around London. (Note: The legislation authorised the purchase of Highgate, Nunhead, Victoria Park, City of London and Tower Hamlets, West of London and Westminster, South Metropolitan, Kensal Green and Abney Park cemeteries.) It could buy land and open new cemeteries to provide a burial service for the Metropolitan Burial District. In the event, only one cemetery was purchased, that is now known as Brompton Cemetery.

== Provisions ==
The Metropolitan Interments Act 1850 (13 & 14 Vict. c. 52) was repealed. The powers of the General Board of Health were reduced to a regulatory role.

== Subsequent developments ==
The Burial Act 1853 (16 & 17 Vict. c. 134) extended the provisions to all of England outside London.

The larger metropolitan vestries were incorporated as sanitary authorities in 1855. The remaining non-administrative vestries retained limited powers, including the ability to set up burial boards.

== Definition of the Metropolis ==
The area of the Metropolis of the purposes of the legislation was given in Schedule A:

- City of London, including Inner Temple and Middle Temple
- In Middlesex:
- City and Liberties of Westminster
  - St Margaret and St John
  - St Paul Covent Garden
  - St Anne Soho
  - Whitehall Gardens
  - Whitehall
  - Richmond Terrace
  - Close of the Collegiate Church of St Peter
  - St Martin in the Fields
  - St George Hanover Square
  - St James
  - St Mary le Strand (Note: Westminster and Duchy of Lancaster parts)
  - St Clement Danes (Note: Westminster and Duchy of Lancaster parts)
- St Giles in the Fields and St George Bloomsbury
- St Andrew Holborn and St George the Martyr
- Saffron Hill, Hatton Garden, Ely Rents and Ely Place
- Liberty of the Rolls
- St Pancras
- St John Hampstead
- St Marylebone
- Paddington
- Precinct of the Savoy
- St Luke
- Liberty of Glasshouse Yard
- St Sepulchre
- St James Clerkenwell (Note: Including St James and St John)
- St Mary Islington
- St Mary Stoke Newington
- Charterhouse
- St Mary Whitechapel
- Christchurch Spitalfields
- St Leonard Shoreditch
- Liberty of Norton Folgate
- St John Hackney
- St Matthew Bethnal Green
- Mile End Old Town
- Mile End New Town
- St Mary Stratford Bow
- Bromley St Leonard
- All Saints Poplar
- St Anne Limehouse
- Ratcliffe
- St Paul Shadwell
- St George in the East
- St John Wapping
- East Smithfield
- Precinct of St Katharine
- Liberties of the Tower of London
  - Old Artillery Ground
  - Minories
  - Old Tower
  - Tower Within
  - Wellclose
- Kensington
- St Luke Chelsea
- Fulham
- Hammersmith
- Lincoln's Inn
- New Inn
- Grays Inn
- Staple Inn
- Furnival's Inn (Note: Part in Middlesex)
- Willesden
- In Kent:
- St Paul Deptford
- St Nicholas Deptford
- Greenwich
- Woolwich
- Charlton
- Plumstead
- In Surrey:
- Borough of Southwark
  - St George the Martyr
  - St Saviour
  - St John Horsleydown
  - St Olave
  - St Thomas
- Battersea (Note: Not including Penge.)
- Bermondsey
- Camberwell
- Clapham
- Lambeth
- Newington
- Putney
- Rotherhithe
- Streatham
- Tooting
- Wandsworth
- Christchurch
- Liberty of the Clink
- Hatcham (Note: Part of Deptford)

== Bibliography ==
- Cunningham Glen, William (1850). Metropolitan Interments Act: 1850, with Introduction, Notes, and Appendix. Shaw. Archived from the original on 13 February 2009.
