= St Olave District (Metropolis) =

Former government district in London

St Olave
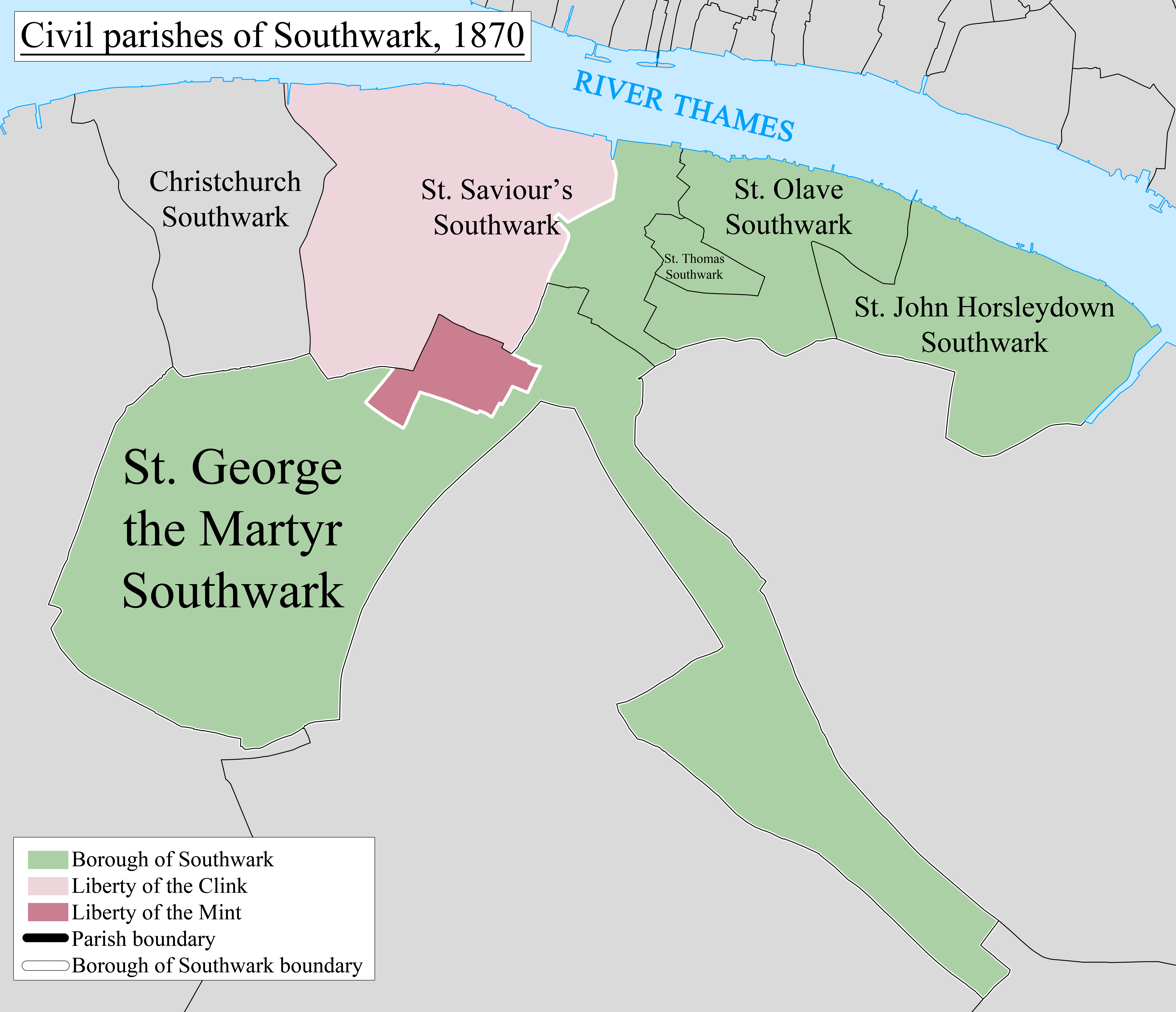
- History
  - Created: 1855
  - Abolished: 1900
  - Succeeded by: Metropolitan Borough of Bermondsey
- Status: District
- Government: St Olave District Board of Works
  - HQ: Vine Street, Tooley Street

St Olave was a local government district within the metropolitan area of London, England from 1855 to 1900. It was formed by the Metropolis Management Act 1855 and was governed by the St Olave District Board of Works, which consisted of elected vestrymen.

Until 1889 the district was in the county of Surrey, but included in the area of the Metropolitan Board of Works. In 1889 the area of the MBW was constituted the County of London, and the district board became a local authority under the London County Council.

== Geography ==
The district had an extensive River Thames frontage, stretching from London Bridge to Shad Thames. It extended inland to cover London Bridge station, part of the approach tracks, and part of the site of Guy's Hospital.

== Area ==
The district comprised the following civil parishes (area in 1881):

- Southwark St John Horsleydown (69 acres)
- Southwark St Olave (48 acres)
- Southwark St Thomas (8 acres)

In 1896 the parishes of Southwark St Olave and St Thomas were combined.

== Abolition ==
The district was abolished in 1900 and became the Metropolitan Borough of Bermondsey. It now forms part of the London Borough of Southwark.
