= Southwark St Olave =

Coordinates: 51°30′16″N 0°4′51″W

Southwark St Olave Southwark St Olave and St Thomas
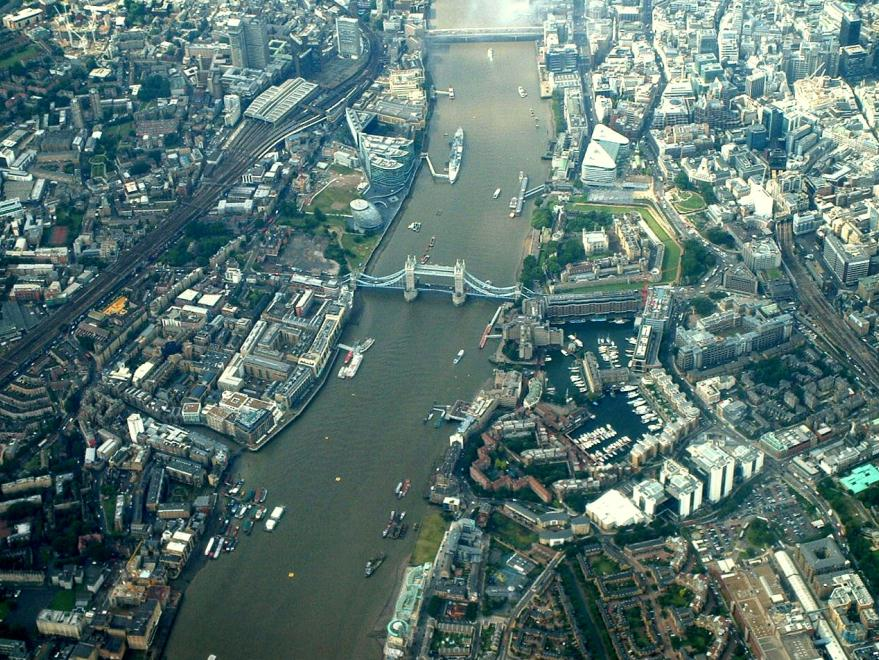
- Southwark St Olave covers most of the left of this 2004 photo

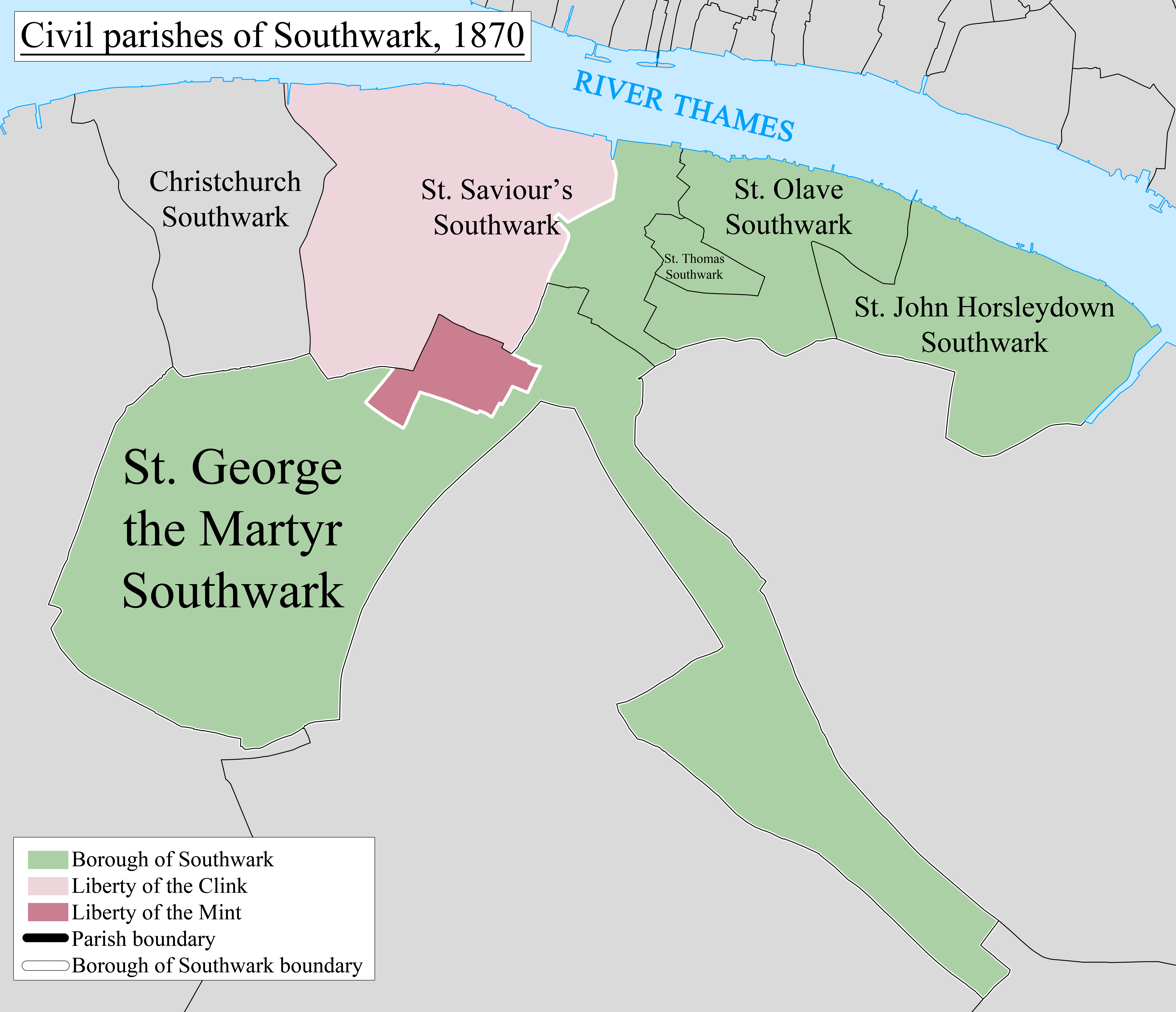
- Area
  - 1891: 48 acres (190,000 m^{2})
- Population
  - 1871: 3,897
  - 1881: 2,247
  - 1891: 2,159
- Density
  - 1871: 81/acre
  - 1881: 47/acre
  - 1891: 45/acre
- History
  - Origin: Ancient parish
  - Abolished: 1904
  - Succeeded by: Bermondsey
- Status: Civil parish
- Today part of: London Borough of Southwark

Southwark St Olave was an ancient civil and ecclesiastical parish on the south bank of the River Thames, covering the area around where Shard London Bridge now stands in the modern London Borough of Southwark, ultimately named after St. King Olaf II of Norway. The boundaries varied over time, but in general the parish stretched east from London Bridge past Tower Bridge to St Saviour's Dock. Southwark St Olave and St Thomas replaced the civil parish in 1896. It was abolished in 1904 and absorbed by Bermondsey parish.

== Boundary changes ==
Southwark St Olave formed part of the ancient Borough of Southwark. Part of its area was split off around 1550 to create Southwark St Thomas, corresponding to the hospital of the Archbishop of Canterbury. In 1733, part of area was used to create Southwark St John Horsleydown.

== Administration ==
A map showing the St Olave & St Thomas wards of Bermondsey Metropolitan Borough as they appeared in 1916.

The parish became, with St John Horsleydown and St Thomas, part of the St Olave Poor Law Union and in 1855 it became part of the St Olave District of the Metropolis. It was absorbed by the County of London in 1889.

In 26 March 1896 St Olave was abolished as a civil parish and was combined again with Southwark St Thomas to form Southwark St Olave and St Thomas. At the 1891 census (the last before the abolition of the parish), Southwark St Olave had a population of 2159. In 1900 the combined parish became part of the Metropolitan Borough of Bermondsey and was abolished in 1904, with its former area absorbed into the Bermondsey civil parish, as was that of St John Horsleydown.

The ecclesiastical parish of St Olave was abolished in 1947, and then formed part of Southwark St Olave and St John.

== Notable people ==
Agnes Cowper was born here in about 1559 and lived here and in a surrounding parish. She is notable because a detailed account of her life was recorded. She died after 1619.

== See also ==
- Tooley Street is the main thoroughfare of the parish and that article covers much of the secular history of the area
