= Burial Act 1854 =

Act of the Parliament of the United Kingdom

Burial Act 1854 (Note: The citation of this act by this short title was authorised by section 1 of, and the first schedule to, the Short Titles Act 1896. Due to the repeal of those provisions it is now authorised by section 19(2) of the Interpretation Act 1978.)
- Act of Parliament
- Parliament of the United Kingdom
- Long title: An Act to make further Provision for the Burial of the Dead in England beyond the Limits of the Metropolis.
- Citation: 17 & 18 Vict. c. 87
- Territorial extent: England & Wales (Note: Preamble.)

Dates
- Royal assent: 10 August 1854
- Commencement: 10 August 1854 (Note: The Acts of Parliament (Commencement) Act 1793.)
- Repealed: 1 April 1974
Other legislation
Amends	Burial Act 1852
Amended by	Statute Law Revision Act 1892; Local Government Act 1933
Repealed by	Local Government Act 1972

Status: Repealed

Text of statute as originally enacted

The Burial Act 1854 (17 & 18 Vict. c. 87) or the Extramural Interment Act 1854 was an act of the Parliament of the United Kingdom. It is one of the Burial Acts 1852 to 1885. Its purpose was to give provision for town councils to establish form burial boards to create and maintain cemeteries for parishes within the jurisdiction using funds from the borough rate.

The act was partially repealed by section 1 of, and the schedule to, the Statute Law Revision Act 1892 (55 & 56 Vict. c. 19), which came into force on 20 June 1892., with the residue repealed by the Local Government Act 1972.
