= Agnes Cowper =

- Born: c. 1559; St Olave Silver Street
- Died: 1619 or later
- Occupation: capper

Agnes Cowper a.k.a. Agnes Shell (born c. 1559) was an English servant and vagrant. She lived in London and her life was recorded in detail as neighboring parishes tried to avoid her being dependent on their charity.

== Life ==
Cowper was born in the parish of St Olave Silver Street. Her father was William Cowper and he did embroidery. Her mother's name is not recorded, but after her father died she remarried to a man called William Shell who was a capper. Her mother and her new stepfather also died. Her stepfather left her an inheritance at the age of twelve of £6 3s 4d. William Giblett was one of the executors and he was also a capper. She became his apprentice working for nine years until he too died. Giblett's executor was Gabriel Wood and in time both Cowper and Giblett's widow went to work for him. Making caps was a skilled profession that was protected by law. In 1571 under the reign of Elizabeth I a new law was passed requiring men to wear a thick knitted cap every Sunday with a penalty fine of 3s/4d for anyone who failed to comply. The caps so worn had to be made in England as the purpose was to protect the trade. Cowper herself realised at this time that the capping business was in decline but she stuck with it until the 1590s when she was about thirty and out of work.

She had no skilled work so she took to unskilled work. She was twelve years with a costermonger named Goodwife Cleere and then as a servant for the Dutch Rossendale family until the recently widowed father decided to return to the continent. From when she was about fifty, she could only find irregular work as a charwoman or begging. The Poor Relief Act 1601 created a poor law in England where Overseer of the poor would distribute money. In 1619 she was identified by Christopher Fawcett as burdensome on St Saviour's parish. She was a vagrant and the parishes wanted to avoid paying for anyone who was not a native of that parish. Cowper was given a detailed interview and biographies of her are largely based on those records. She was returned to St Olave's parish but they returned her until in July 1619 the two parishes decided to split the cost of keeping her as the case was too complex to resolve otherwise.
