= Southwark St John Horsleydown =

Former parish by the Thames in London

Coordinates: 51.504°N 0.079°W

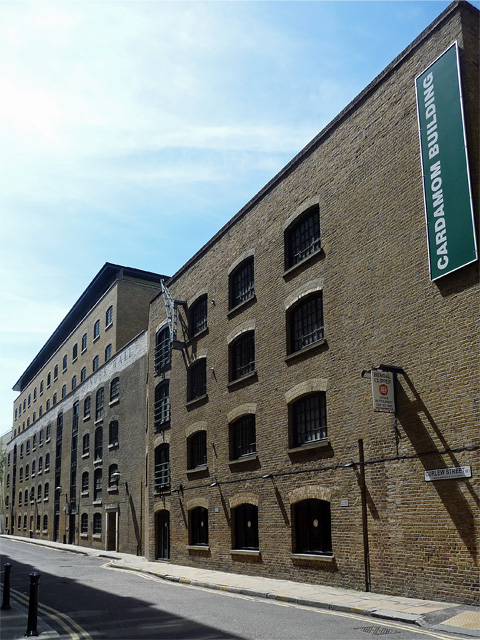

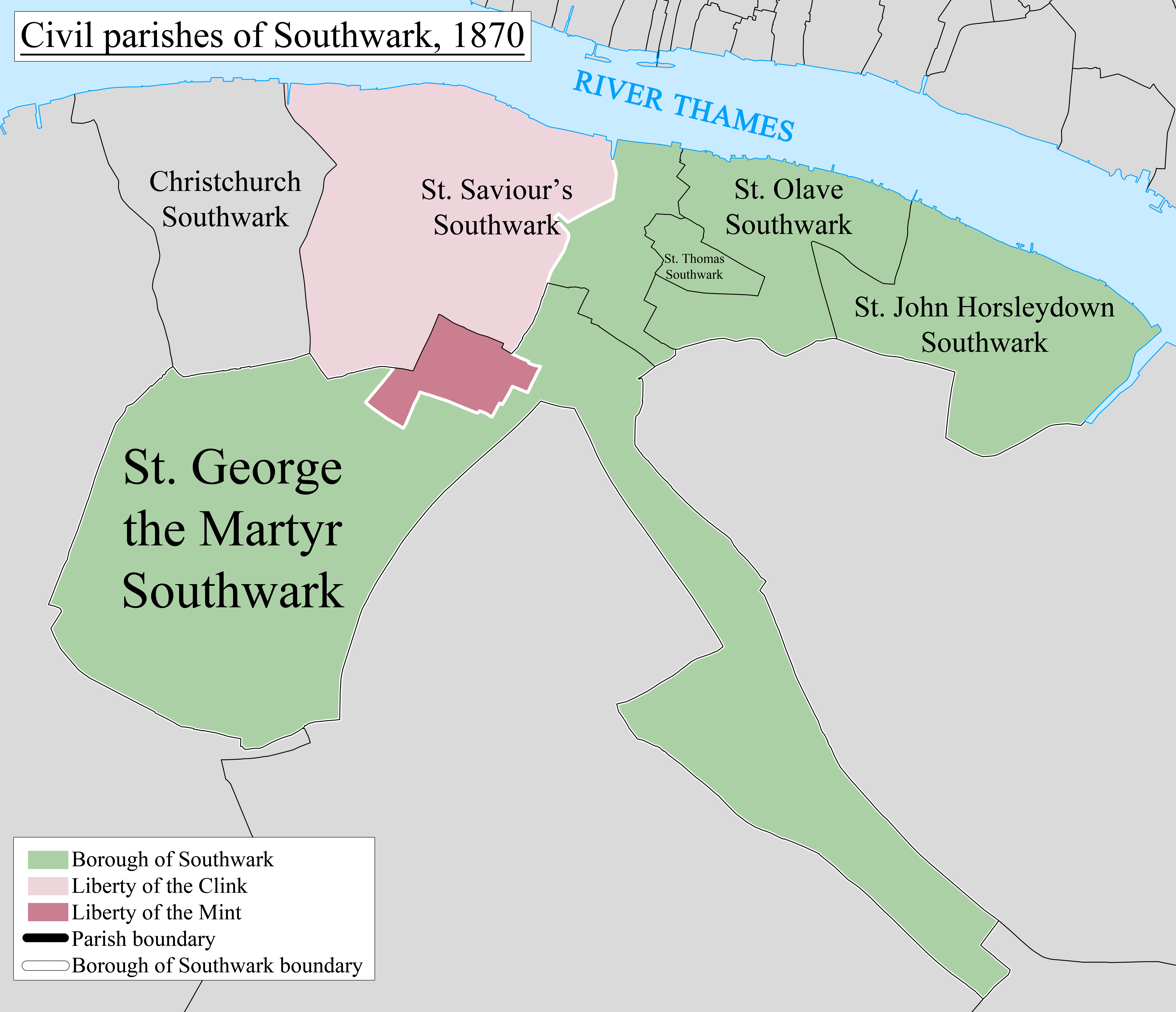
- Area
  - 1851: 94 acres (38 ha)
  - 1901: 70 acres (28 ha)
- Population
  - 1851: 11,360
  - 1901: 7,769
- Density
  - 1851: 120 per acre (300/ha)
  - 1901: 111 per acre (270/ha)
- History
  - Created: 1733
  - Abolished: 1904
  - Succeeded by: Bermondsey
- Status: Civil parish

A map showing the St John ward of Bermondsey Metropolitan Borough as it appeared in 1916.

Southwark St John Horsleydown was a small parish on the south bank of the River Thames in London, opposite the Tower of London. The name Horsleydown, apparently derived from the "horse lie-down" next to the river, is no longer used. The parish was created by splitting St Olave's parish in 1733.

In the metropolitan re-organisation of 1855 it was grouped into the St Olave District with St Olave's and St Thomas's sending a joint representative to the Metropolitan Board of Works and remained as such after the 1889 creation of the County of London.

The civil parish became part of the Metropolitan Borough of Bermondsey in 1900 when the St Olave District was abolished, and on 1 April 1904 Southwark St John Horsleydown was absorbed into the Bermondsey parish. At the 1901 census (the last before the abolition of the parish), Southwark St John Horsleydown had a population of 7769. Since 1965 it has formed part of the London Borough of Southwark.

It had a population, recorded in the census, of:

Civil parish of St John Horsleydown 1801-1901

Year	1801	1811	1821	1831	1841	1851	1861	1871	1881	1891	1901
Population	8,892	8,370	9,163	9,871	10,665	11,360	11,393	10,500	8,928	9,812	7,769
