= Meath Gardens =

Park in Bethnal Green in the London Borough of Tower Hamlets in East London

Coordinates: 51.527°N 0.044°W

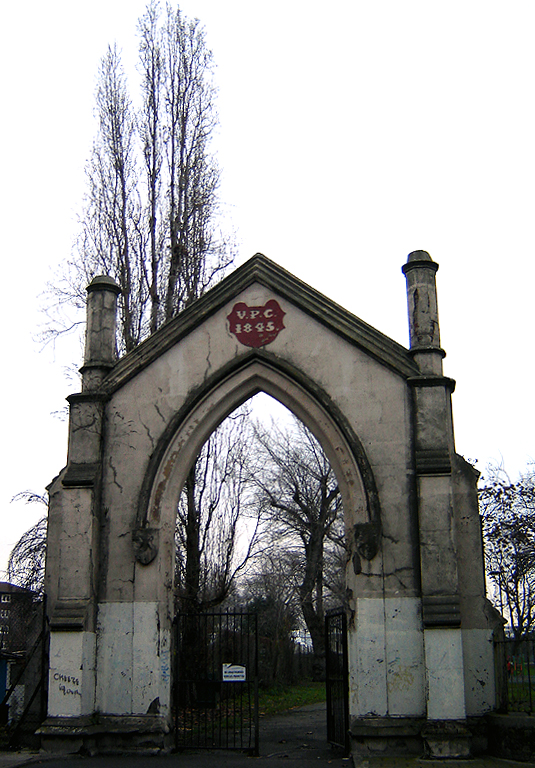
Gateway to Victoria Park Cemetery

Meath Gardens is a 4.1642 hectares (10.290 acres) park in Bethnal Green in the London Borough of Tower Hamlets in East London, England, and opened to the public in 1894. Before it became a park, it was the Victoria Park Cemetery.

== Victoria Park Cemetery ==
Land for Victoria Park Cemetery was purchased in 1840, by Charles Butler, who would later (1852–68) be MP for Tower Hamlets. Butler then transferred the land to create a privately owned burial ground, which was opened in 1842. The cemetery was never consecrated. There were two chapels in the cemetery, designed by the architect Arthur Ashpitel, both of which have since been demolished. The surviving Gothic arch gateway (with the inscription 'VPC 1845') was restored in 2017.

One of the burials in the cemetery was Bripumyarrimin, known as King Cole, who was a member of the Australian Aboriginal cricket team in England in 1868, the first representative cricket team to tour England from Australia. Bripumyarrimin died on the tour from tuberculosis and pneumonia and was buried in an unmarked grave in the cemetery. A commemorative plaque was set into the ground by the Aboriginal Cricket Association in 1988, and a further commemoration occurred in 2018 on the 150th anniversary of the tour. Bripumyarrimin's grave was the inspiration for the 2010 novel The Clay Dreaming by Ed Hillyer, better known as the graphic artist ILYA.

Although well-managed initially, the cemetery was a poor financial venture, becoming insolvent in 1853, and eventually ceased trading. It closed to burials in 1876, with some 300,000 bodies interred. It was allowed to fall into ruin: Lt-Col J. J. Sexby, the first Chief Officer for Parks for the newly formed London County Council, described its state as 'a disgrace and a scandal'.

The cemetery records are held at the London Metropolitan Archives.

== Meath Park ==
Lord Brabazon established the Metropolitan Public Gardens Association in 1882, partly for the purpose of converting disused burial grounds into parks and gardens for public recreation. The Disused Burial Grounds Act 1884, by preventing construction on former burial grounds, destroyed the development value of the former cemetery. As early as 1885, the MPGA attempted to acquire the cemetery from Butler's surviving son and trustee, the Rev John Banks Meek Butler, but without success. After protracted negotiations, the MPGA raised funds for the London County Council to acquire it in 1891, with work commencing in 1893. It was one of the largest burial grounds that the MPGA's landscape gardener Fanny Wilkinson converted into a public garden. She was assisted by 30 unemployed men, the work taking a year as the ground proved hard to dig. The garden was opened by the Duke of York in 1894, and renamed after the Earl of Meath, Lord Brabazon having inherited the earldom in 1887. The laid out gardens included playgrounds and gymnastic equipment.

The park was poorly maintained during the 20th-century. A chemical plant was built on part of the park in the 1950s. Parts along the eastern boundary were lost to development in the 1960s, and parts along the southern boundary were lost to housing in the 1990s. Originally 11 1/2 acres in size, the park is now only 10 acres.

Facilities include children's play equipment and basketball and football facilities. From 2000 to 2008, the park was home to Bethnal Green FC (later renamed Tower Hamlets FC).

The park has held a Green Flag Award since 2016.

A Friends of Meath Gardens group was established in 2015.
