= Southwark St Thomas =

- Civil parish
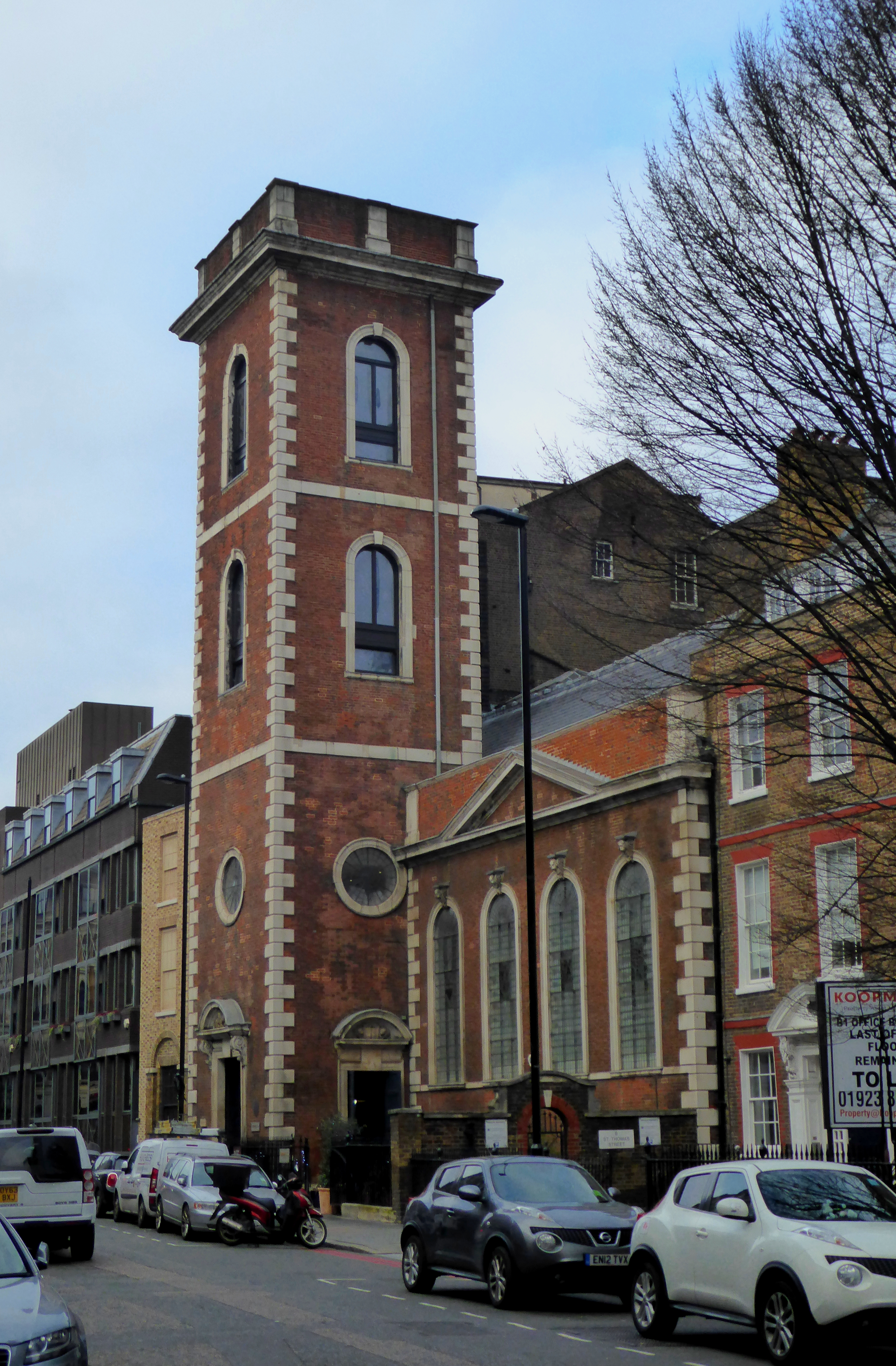
- Area
  - 1891: 8 acres (0.032 km^{2})
- Population
  - 1891: 752
- History
  - Abolished: 26 March 1896
  - Succeeded by: Southwark St Olave and St Thomas

Southwark St Thomas was an ancient parish in the ancient borough of Southwark. It was abolished in 1896 and merged with St Olave to form Southwark St Olave and St Thomas. At the 1891 census (the last before the abolition of the parish), Southwark St Thomas had a population of 752.

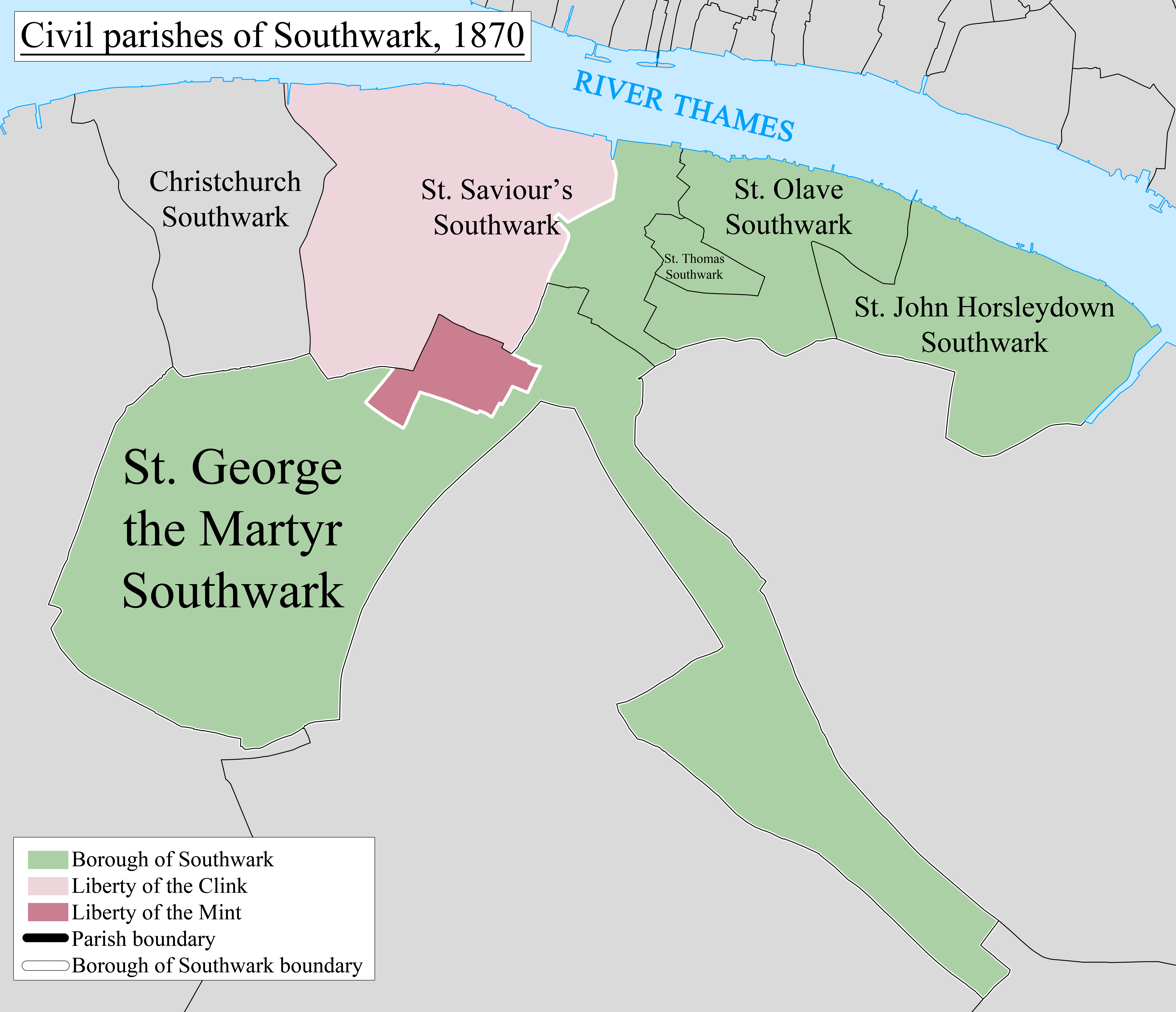
A map showing the parish of St Thomas within Southwark

== History ==
It became part of the St Olave District in 1855.

The small civil parish of Southwark St Thomas was merged into Southwark St Olave and St Thomas on 26 March 1896. And that then merged into Bermondsey parish in 1904 to reflect the previous establishment of the metropolitan borough.
