= Holborn =

Coordinates: 51.5204°N 0.1136°W

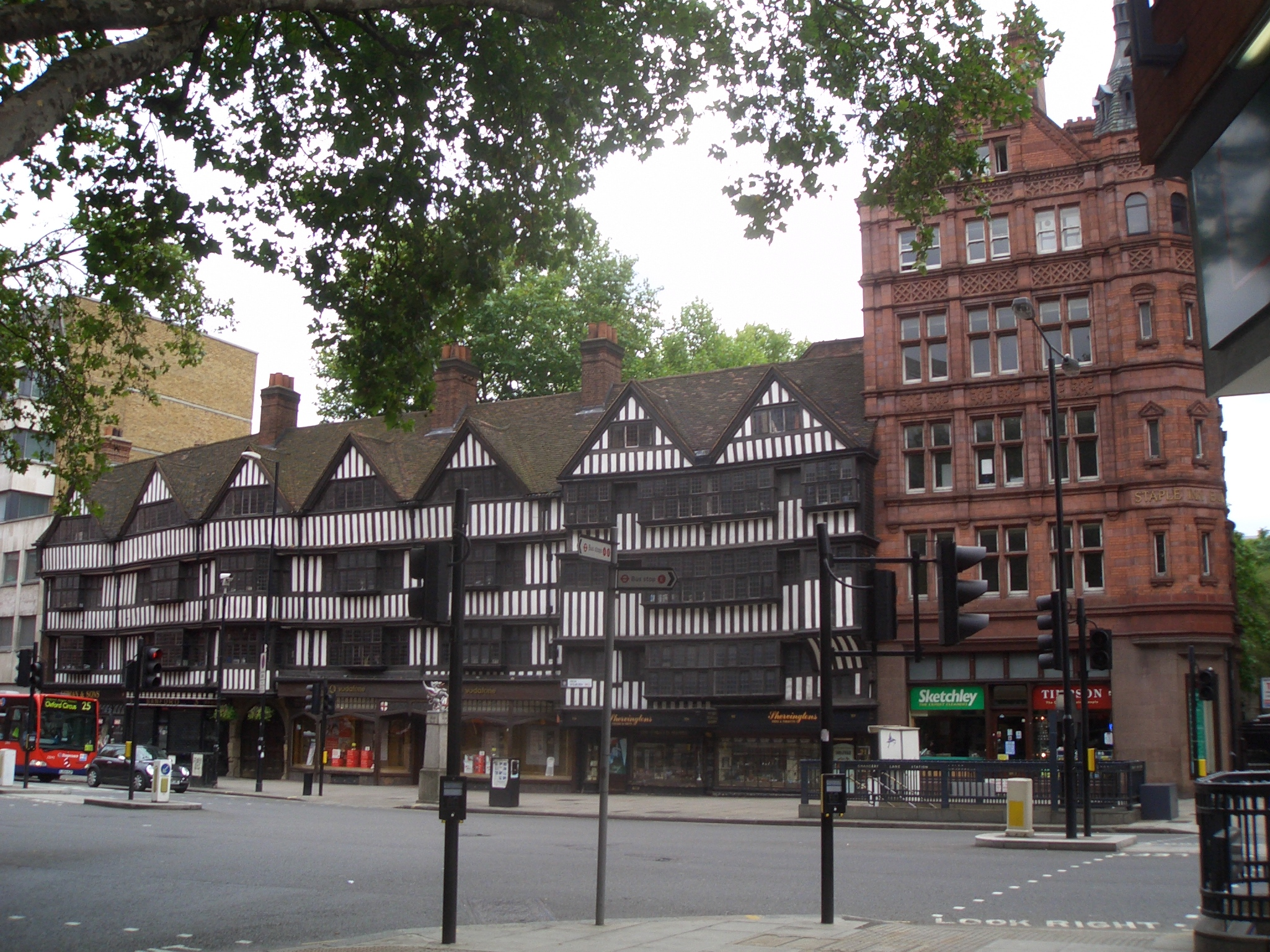
- Staple Inn, near Chancery Lane tube station, the last of the Inns of Chancery

- Location within Greater London
- Population: 13,023 (2011 Census. Holborn and Covent Garden Ward)
- OS grid reference: TQ310818
- London borough: Camden
- Ceremonial county: Greater London
- Region: London
- Country: England
- Sovereign state: United Kingdom
- Post town: LONDON
- Postcode district: WC1, WC2
- Postcode district: EC1
- Dialling code: 020
- Police: Metropolitan
- Fire: London
- Ambulance: London
- UK Parliament: Holborn and St Pancras; Cities of London and Westminster
- London Assembly: Barnet and Camden; City and East

Holborn (/ˈhoʊbərn/ HOH-bərn or /ˈhoʊlbərn/ HOHL-bərn^{[a]}) is an area in central London, that covers the southeastern part of the London Borough of Camden and a part (St Andrew Holborn Below the Bars) of the Ward of Farringdon Without in the City of London.

The area has its roots in the ancient parish of Holborn, which lay on the west bank of the now buried River Fleet; the district takes its name from an alternative name for the river: the Holbourne (or Oldbourne). The area is sometimes described as part of the West End of London or of the wider West London area.

The River Fleet also gave its name to the streets Holborn and High Holborn which extend west from the site of the former Newgate in the London Wall, over the Fleet, through Holborn and towards Westminster.

The district benefits from a central location which helps provide a strong mixed economy. The area is particularly noted for its links to the legal profession, for the diamond centre at Hatton Garden and for Great Ormond Street Hospital.

== Origins and administration ==
Holborn emerged from the ancient parish of St Andrew Holborn and its later sub-divisions. The parish church is first mentioned, and described as old, in a charter of 959, but this is before the parish or the landholdings on which it was based took on anything like their settled form.

=== Toponymy ===
The earliest surviving written record of the area occurs in a charter of 959, in which King Edgar the Peaceful granted Westminster Abbey an area of land (much larger than the later parish of Holborn) stretching from the Abbey, on Thorney Island, to the River Fleet. The charter mentions "the old wooden church of St Andrew" (St Andrew, Holborn). The name Holborn is used in the charter, but it refers to the River Fleet rather than the district.

The name "Holborn" may derive from the Middle English hol for "hollow", and bourne, a "brook", referring to the River Fleet as it ran through a steep valley (hollow) in places.

However, the 16th-century historian John Stow attributes the name to a different watercourse: the Old Bourne ("old brook"), a small stream which he believed ran into the Fleet at Holborn Bridge. This structure was lost when the river was culverted in 1732. The exact course of the stream is uncertain, but according to Stow it started in one of the many small springs near Holborn Bar, the old City toll gate on the summit of Holborn Hill. Other historians, however, find the theory implausible, in view of the slope of the land.

=== Administration: Parish and Ward ===
The Parish of St Andrew, Holborn, was divided by a civil boundary, with part within the Farringdon Without ward of the City of London (later known as St Andrew Holborn Below the Bars) – which includes the parish church and the part within the Ossulstone Hundred of Middlesex (later known as St Andrew Above the Bars). It is not known when the parish of Holborn took on its settled form, but it is likely to have been by the time of the introduction of Canon Law around 1180, with records from the time the hospital of St Giles was established in 1120 indicating that the parish extended further west at that time, presumably to encompass what would become the combined parish of St Giles and Bloomsbury.

A charter of around 1000 shows the boundaries of the city being pushed west to their settled historic extent in around 1000, though this extramural area would have been very sparsely settled. The city's wards take shape in the 11th century, before the Norman Conquest. The civil division of the parish is very ancient and predates the establishment of the parish in its settled form. In 1394 the Ward of Farringdon was subdivided into Farringdon Within and Farringdon Without, with south-east Holborn part of the latter.

The City Bars mark the boundary of the City of London within Holborn. In 1994 the City boundary shifted slightly to the junction of Chancery Lane and the Bars were moved accordingly.

=== Many Civil Parishes ===
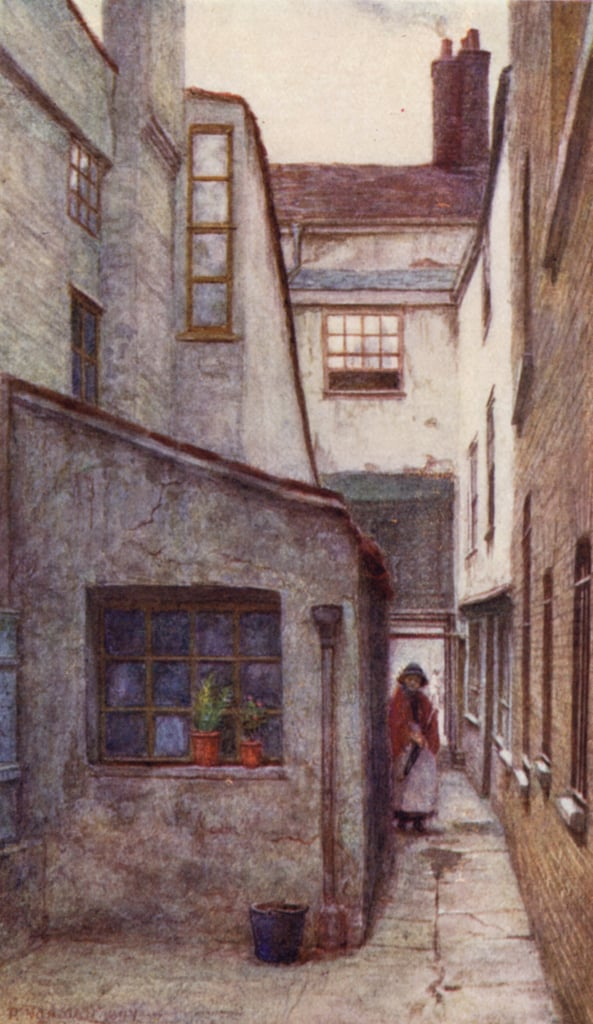
Passage North side of Holborn, 1897 by Philip Norman

It has been described how the two parts of the parish came under separate civil governance (though without any civil governance at parish level) according to whether the part was in the city or outside. From the Tudor period onwards new local government were introduced in England, and parish areas were obliged to take on civil as well as ecclesiastical responsibilities for the first time, this started with relief of the poor.

The two parts became, for civil but not ecclesiastical purposes, two separate parishes known as St Andrew Holborn Below the Bars and St Andrew Holborn Above the Bars, the Bars being the City boundary markers. The area "above Bars" (outside the city's jurisdiction) was organised by the vestry board of the parish of St Andrew.

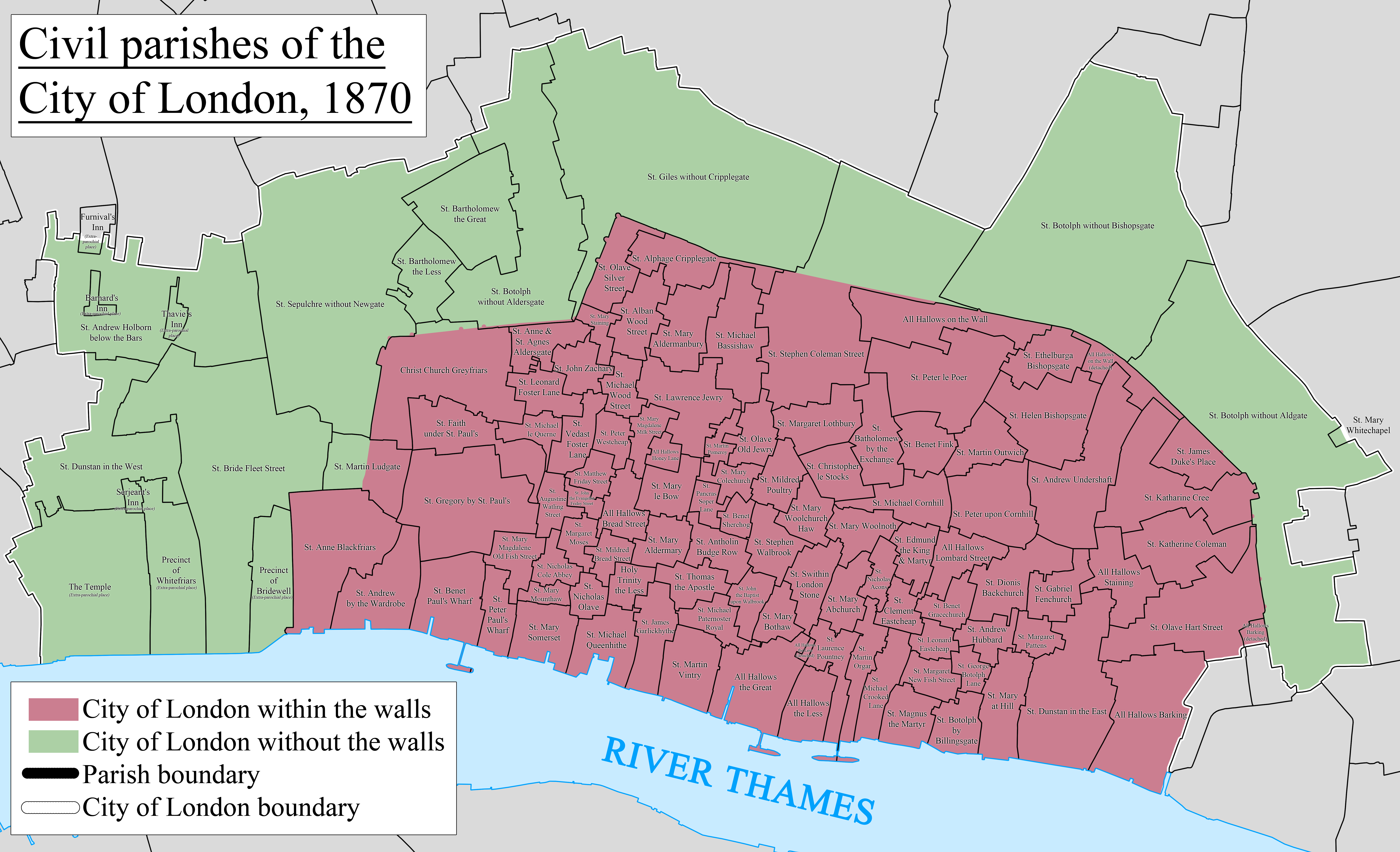
St Andrew Holborn, Below the Bars, in the west of the City of London

As well as Holborn's two main civil parishes, there were a number of extra-parochial areas, parts of the ecclesiastical parish of Holborn but formed their own (usually tiny) civil parish areas:

- Liberty of Saffron Hill, Hatton Garden, Ely Rents and Ely Place
- Lincoln's Inn (excluding Lincoln's Inn Fields, in the combined parish of St Giles and Bloomsbury)
- Thavie's Inn
- Barnard's Inn
- Furnival's Inn
- Gray's Inn
- Staple Inn

=== Response to urbanisation ===
The St George the Martyr Queen Square area became a separate parish, for both civil and ecclesiastical matters, in 1723; but for civil matters was reunited with the part of St Andrew outside the city (Above the Bars) of London in 1767, to form St Andrew Holborn Above the Bars with St George the Martyr.

The Holborn District was created in 1855, consisting of the civil parishes and extra-parochial places of Holborn outside the city; St Andrew Holborn Above the Bars with St George the Martyr, Saffron Hill, Hatton Garden, Ely Rents and Ely Place, as well as two tiny units that were added from the Finsbury Division: Glasshouse Yard and St Sepulchre, Middlesex.

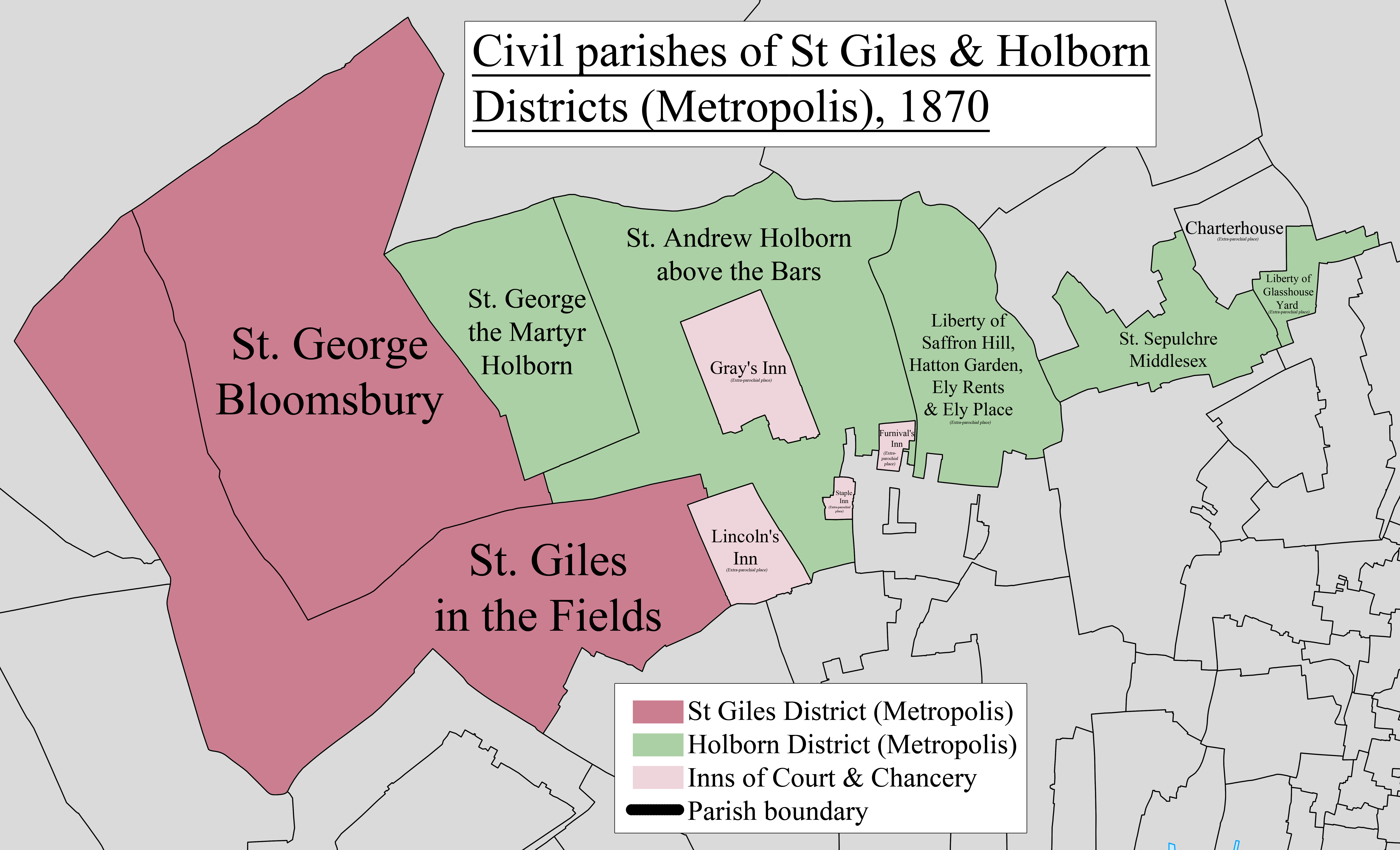
The Holborn District (in green, but excluding St Sepulchre Middlesex and Glasshouse Yard which had been attached to it) merged with the combined parishes of St Giles and Bloomsbury (in red), in 1900, to form the Metropolitan Borough of Holborn.

The parts of Holborn outside the City formed the eastern part of the Metropolitan Borough of Holborn. The former combined parish of Bloomsbury and St Giles (including most of the Lincoln's Inn Ward).

The Metropolitan Borough of Holborn was created in 1900, consisting of the former area of the Holborn District and the St Giles District, but the small units previously part of the Finsbury Division were instead included in the Metropolitan Borough of Finsbury. The Metropolitan Borough of Holborn was abolished in 1965 and its area now forms part of the London Borough of Camden.

== Latter history ==
=== Urban growth ===
The westward growth of London beyond the City Wall, and towards the seat of government in Westminster, took place along the banks of the River Thames and along the roads leading from Ludgate (Fleet Street and The Strand) and Newgate (Holborn and High Holborn). This growth, initially limited to Farringdon Without (which includes a part of Holborn) was well underway in the 12th century, leading to the Ward being retrospectively described as the capital's original West End.

In the 12th century St Andrew's was noted in local title deeds as lying on "Holburnestrate"—Holborn Street, but as the street leads from Roman Newgate, and the church was sited on it by the 10th century, it is probably considerably older. In 1394 the population had grown so large that the Ward of Farringdon had grown too large for effective governance and was formally divided into the separate Wards, (rather than separate named areas within the same Ward) in 1394.

The westward growth towards Westminster accelerated in the Tudor period. The westerly ribbon development through the parish was complete before the Great Fire of 1666, with the displacement of people accelerating the development of the rest of the area. The northern fringe the last area to be developed, with this process finalised in the 18th century.

=== Medieval ===
St Etheldreda's Church, in gated Ely Place, was originally the chapel of the Bishop of Ely's London palace. This ecclesiastical connection allowed the street to remain part of the county of Cambridgeshire until the mid-1930s. This meant that Ye Olde Mitre, a pub located in a court hidden behind the buildings of the Place and the Garden, was licensed by the Cambridgeshire Magistrates.

St Etheldreda's is the oldest Roman Catholic church in Britain, and one of two extant buildings in London dating back to the era of Edward I.

=== Tudor and Stuart periods ===
Henry VII paid for the road to be paved in 1494 because the thoroughfare "was so deep and miry that many perils and hazards were thereby occasioned, as well to the king's carriages passing that way, as to those of his subjects". Criminals from the Tower and Newgate passed up Holborn on their way to be hanged at Tyburn or St Giles.

Hatton Garden, the centre of the diamond trade, was leased to a favourite of Queen Elizabeth I, Sir Christopher Hatton, at the insistence of the Queen to provide him with an income.

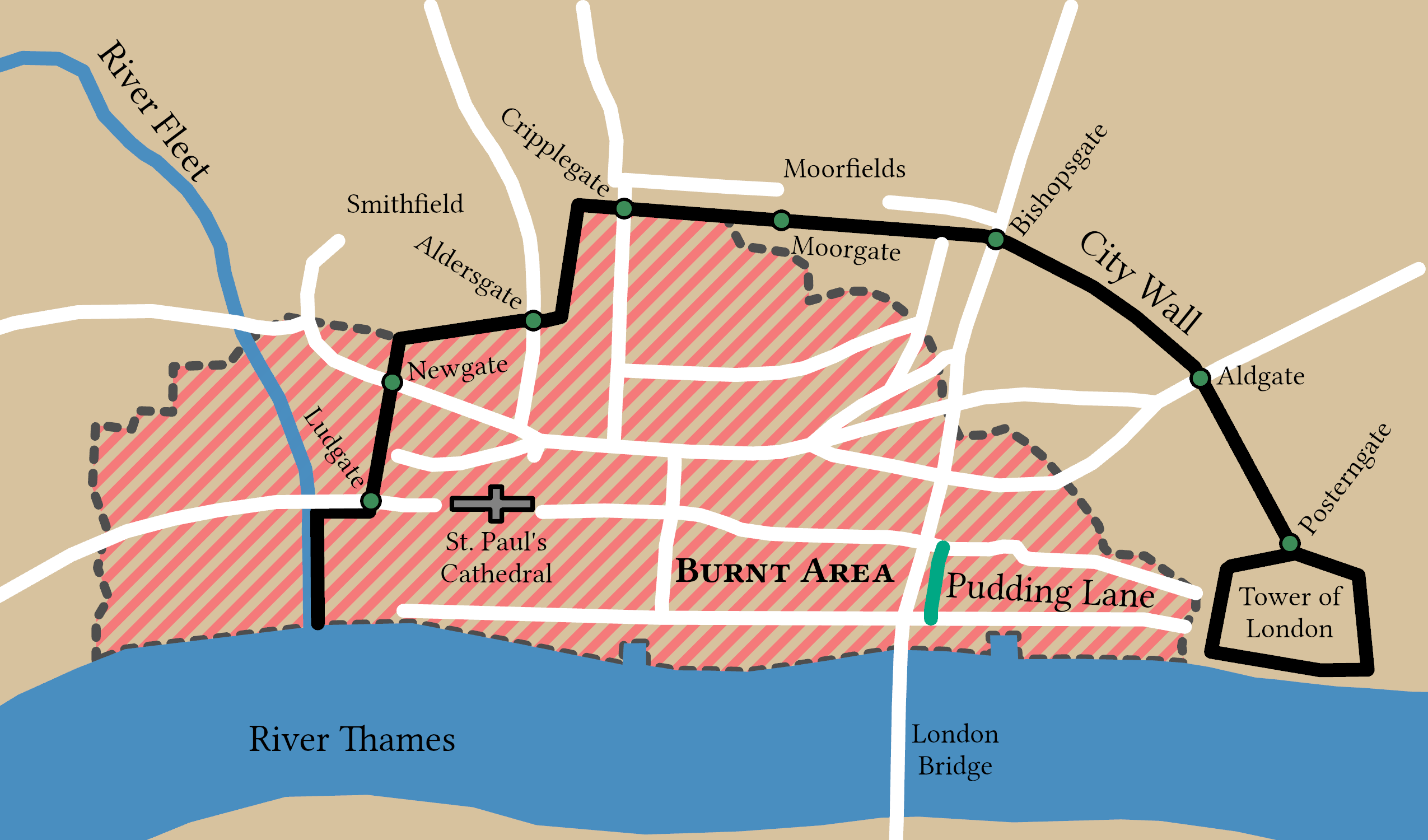
The Great Fire died as it reached Holborn's boundary.

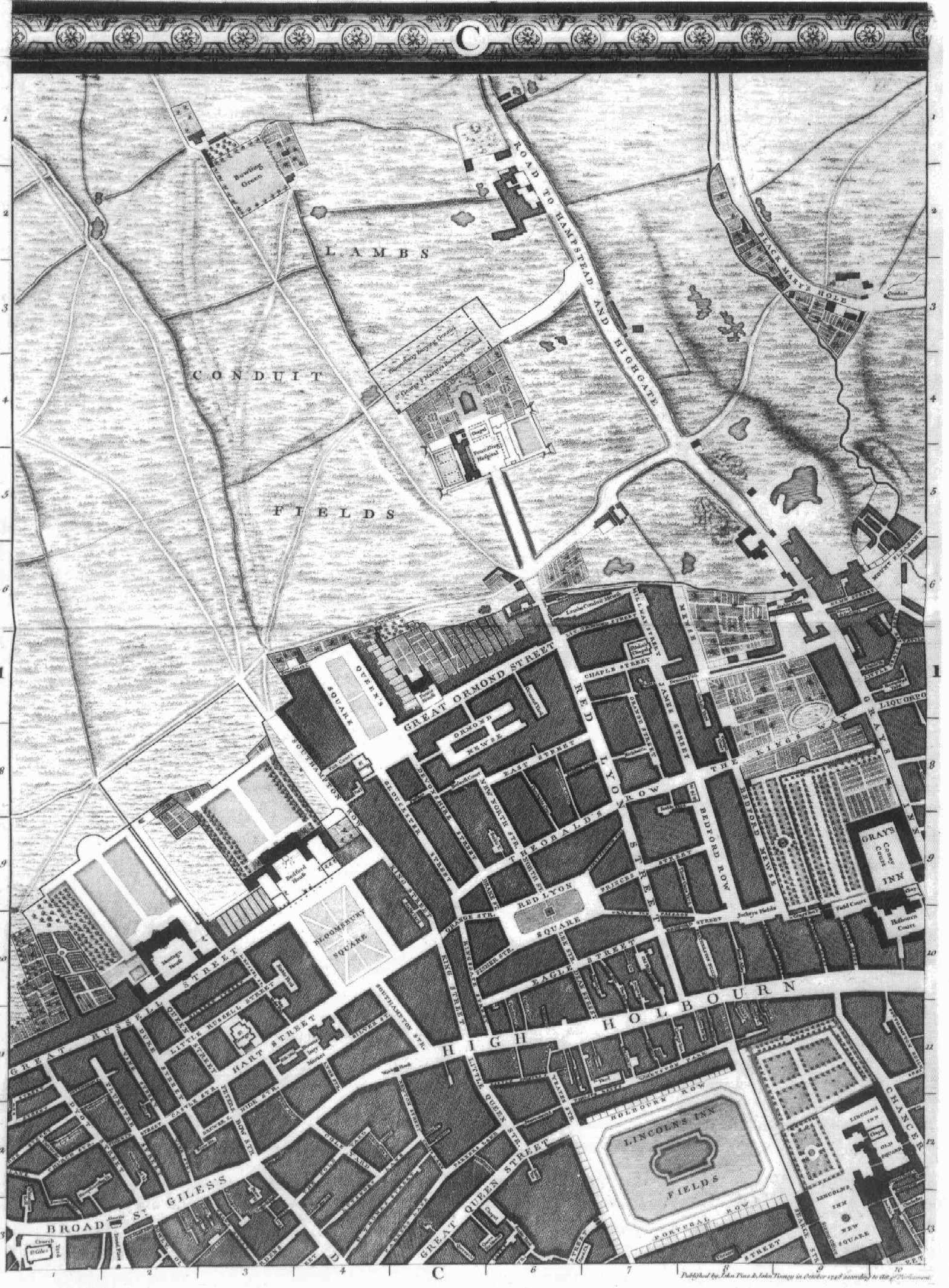
Rocque map of 1746. Holborn is developed, but the built-up area stopped at the brook which formed the parish boundary with St Pancras (modern King's Cross) to the north.

The area was not damaged by the Great Fire of London in 1666, though the area of destruction reached its south-eastern boundary.

=== Legal profession ===
Charles Dickens took up residence in Furnival's Inn (later the site of "Holborn Bars", the former Prudential building designed by Alfred Waterhouse). Dickens put his character "Pip", in Great Expectations, in residence at Barnard's Inn opposite, now occupied by Gresham College. Staple Inn, notable as the promotional image for Old Holborn tobacco, is nearby. The three of these were Inns of Chancery. The most northerly of the Inns of Court, Gray's Inn, is off Holborn, as is Lincoln's Inn: the area has been associated with the legal professions since mediaeval times, and the name of the local militia (now Territorial Army unit, the Inns of Court & City Yeomanry) still reflects that. The unit is nicknamed the Devil's Own, a name given by George III, not due to ferocity in battle, but rather to his dislike of lawyers.

=== Historic points of interest ===
In the 18th century, Holborn was the location of the infamous Mother Clap's molly house (meeting place for homosexual men). There were 22 inns or taverns recorded in the 1860s. The Holborn Empire, originally Weston's Music Hall, stood between 1857 and 1960, when it was pulled down after structural damage sustained in the Blitz. The theatre premièred one of the first full-length feature films in 1914, The World, the Flesh and the Devil, a 50-minute melodrama filmed in Kinemacolor.

Subsequently, the area diversified and become recognisable as the modern street. A plaque stands at number 120 commemorating Thomas Earnshaw's invention of the Marine chronometer, which facilitated long-distance travel. At the corner of Hatton Garden was the old family department store of Gamages. Until 1992, the London Weather Centre was located in the street. The Prudential insurance company relocated in 2002. The Daily Mirror offices used to be directly opposite it, but the site is now occupied by Sainsbury's head office.

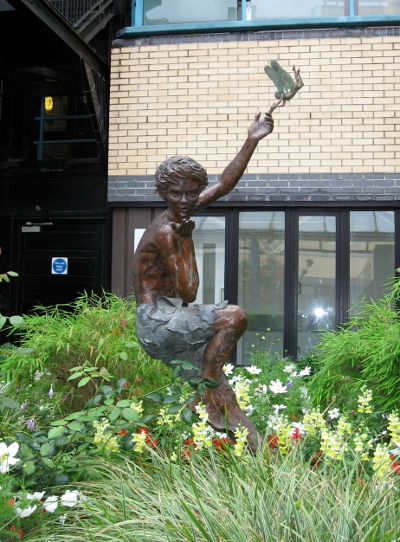
Peter Pan statue at Great Ormond Street Hospital

Behind the Prudential Building lies the Anglo-Catholic church of St Alban the Martyr. Originally built in 1863 by architect William Butterfield, it was gutted during the Blitz but later reconstructed, retaining Butterfield's west front.

On Holborn Circus lies the Church of St Andrew, an ancient Guild Church that survived the Great Fire of London. However, the parochial authority decided to commission Sir Christopher Wren to rebuild it. Although the nave was destroyed in the Blitz, the reconstruction was faithful to Wren's original. Just to the west of the circus, but originally sited in the middle, is a large equestrian statue of Prince Albert by Charles Bacon, erected in 1874 as the city's official monument to him. It was presented by Charles Oppenheim, of the diamond trading company De Beers, whose headquarters is in nearby Charterhouse Street.

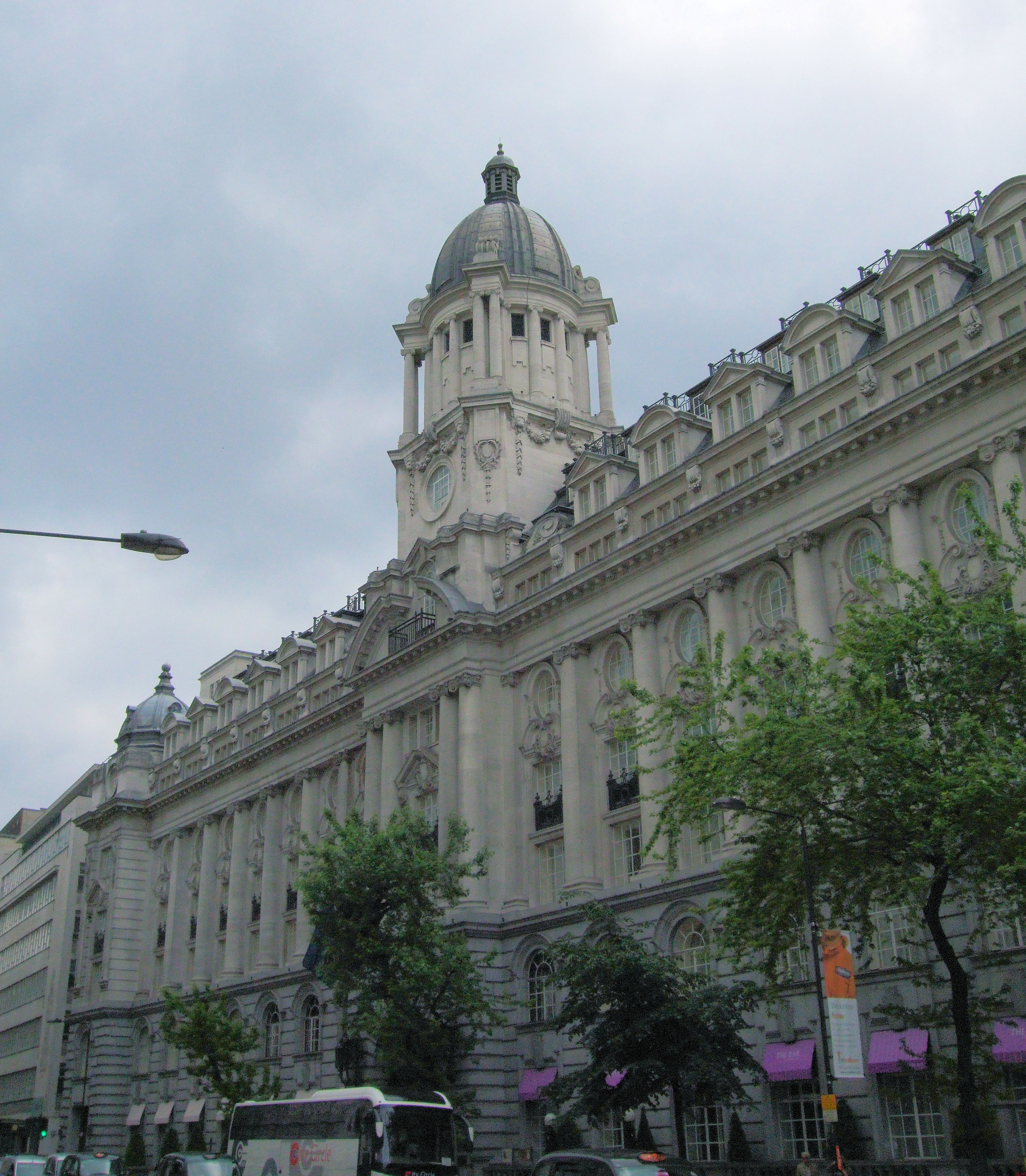
Former Pearl Assurance Company building, now the Rosewood London

== Geography ==
The district can best be described in reference to the ancient parish and the sub-divisions that succeeded it, however the area is not an administrative unit so contemporary perceptions of its extent can be vague and highly variable. In particular there are overlapping perceptions of the extent of the districts of Holborn, Bloomsbury and St Giles. One of the many factors in this, is a tendency to conflate the Holborn and High Holborn roads with the district.

The now buried River Fleet formed the historic eastern boundary of the ancient parish of Holborn, a course now marked by Farringdon Street, Farringdon Road and other streets. The northern boundary with St Pancras was formed by a tributary of the Fleet later known as Lamb's Conduit. The curving alignment of Roger Street follows part of the course of that lost brook, and marked the northern boundary of the parish and later borough.

The area extends west from Farringdon Street, for three-quarters of a mile, roughly as far as Southampton Row and Holborn tube station. The station was originally named Holborn (Kingsway) as it was on the junction of those two roads. Most of the area lies north of the eponymous road, rather than to the south.

=== Transport ===
The nearest London Underground stations are Chancery Lane and Holborn. The closest mainline railway station is City Thameslink.

Holborn is served by bus routes 1, 8, 10, 19, 25, 38, 55, 59, 68, 76, 91, 98, 133, 168, 171, 188, 243, 341, SL6 and night routes N1, N8, N19, N38, N41, N55, N68 and N171.

=== Nearby areas ===
- Bloomsbury
- Clerkenwell
- Smithfield
- Charing Cross
- Soho
- Covent Garden
- St. Giles
- Piccadilly

== Economy ==
In the early 21st century, Holborn has become the site of new offices and hotels. For example, the old neoclassical Pearl Assurance building near the junction with Kingsway was converted into a hotel in 1999.

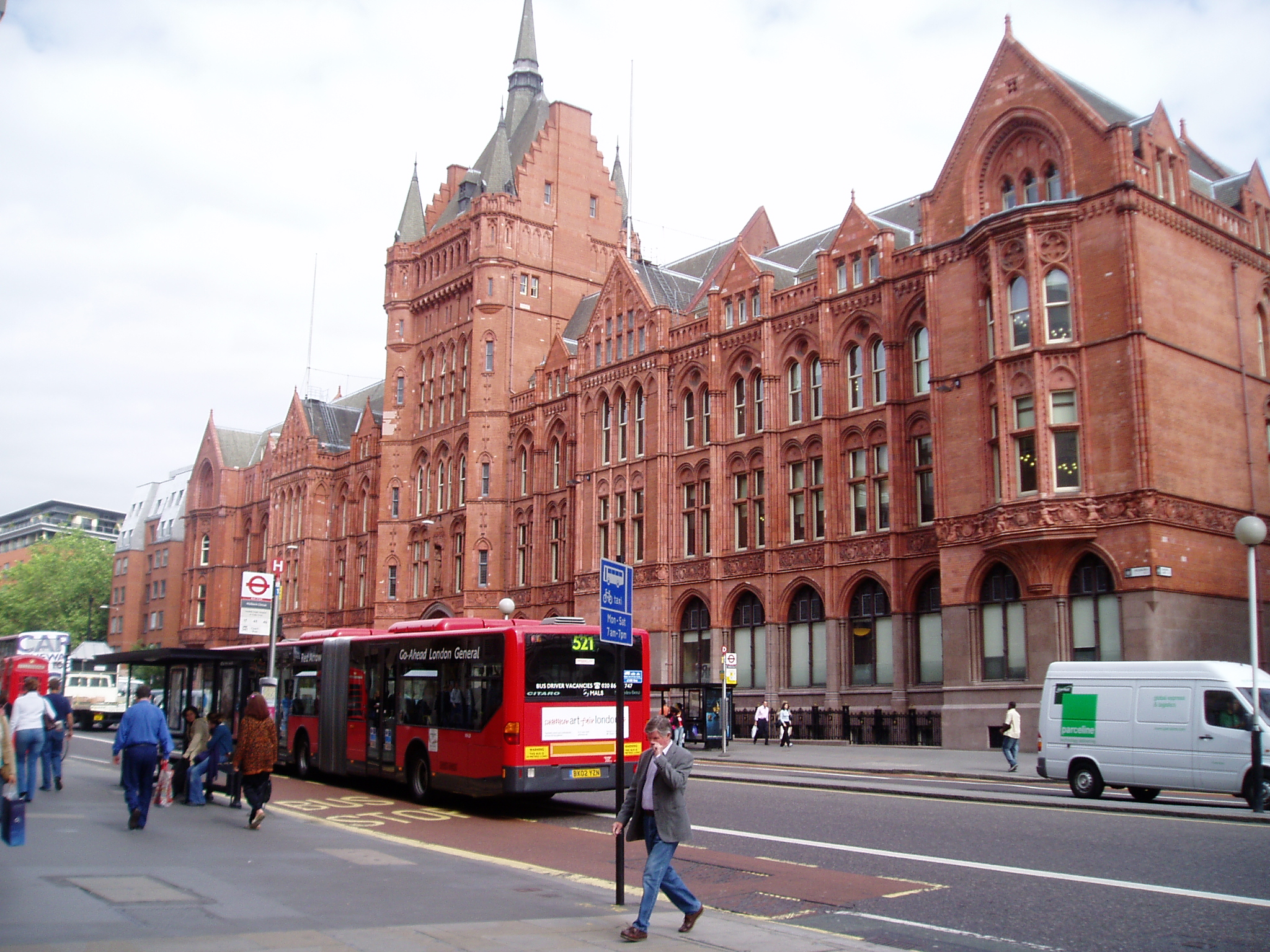
Holborn Bars, built 1879–1901, headquarters of the Prudential Assurance Company, at 138–142 Holborn

There has been attempts by some commercial organisations to rebrand the southern parts of the London Borough of Camden (Holborn, Bloomsbury and St Giles; the former Metropolitan Borough of Holborn) as "Midtown". This area, is notionally in the very middle of London, being situated between the Westminster and the City, but this Americanisation has been widely criticised and not accepted or used by Londoners.

== Representation ==
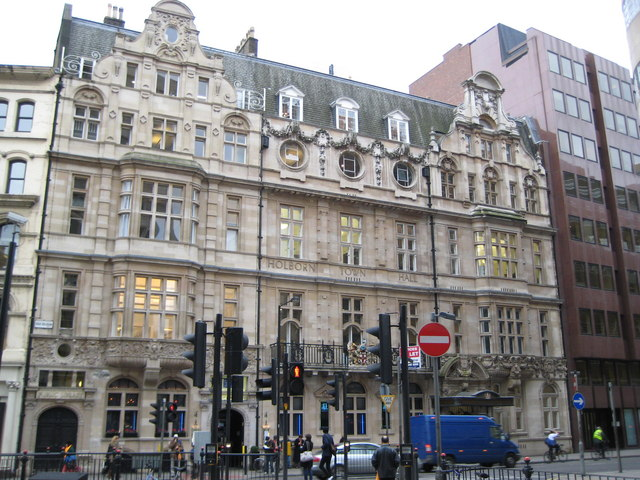
The former Holborn Town Hall, completed 1894

The MPs for the area are:

- Keir Starmer MP, the Labour Party Member of Parliament for Holborn and St Pancras;
- Rachel Blake, the Labour MP for the Cities of London and Westminster, which includes the City of London portion of Holborn.

The three ward councillors for Holborn and Covent Garden, representing the London Borough of Camden part of the district are:

- Cllr Hamza Chowdhury, Cllr Jim Monahan and Cllr James White of the Green Party.

Holborn is represented in the London Assembly as part of Barnet and Camden by:

- Anne Clarke, of the Labour Party.

== Notable people ==
The following is a list of notable people who were born in or are significantly connected with Holborn.

- Matthew Ball, principal dancer of the Royal Ballet lives there.
- John Barbirolli (1899–1970), conductor, born in Southampton Row (blue plaque on hotel his father managed)
- John William Bean (1824–1882), criminal, born in Holborn. He attempted to assassinate Queen Victoria.
- Thomas Chatterton (1752–1770), poet, born in Bristol and died in a garret in Holborn at the age of 17
- Samuel Coleridge-Taylor (1875–1912), composer, born at 15 Theobalds Road; acclaimed especially for The Song of Hiawatha trilogy
- Sir John Elley (1764–1839), a hero of the Napoleonic Wars, born to the owner of an eating-house in Furnival's Inn
- James Day (1850–1895), cricketer, born in Holborn
- Charles Dickens (1812–1870). He lived in Doughty Street, where his house is now a museum.
- Rupert Farley, actor and voice actor, born in Holborn
- Naomi Lewis (1911–2009), advocate of animal rights, poet, children's author and teacher. She lived in Red Lion Square from 1935 to 2009.
- Eric Morley (1918–2000), founder of the Miss World pageant, born in Holborn
- William Morris (1845–1896), artist and socialist. He lived at 8 Red Lion Square.
- Frederico Perera (1836–1909), first-class cricketer
- Pedro Perera (1832–1915), first-class cricketer
- Ann Radcliffe (1764–1823), novelist and pioneer of the Gothic novel, born in Holborn
- John Shaw Jr. (1803–1870), architect, born in Holborn; praised as a designer in the "Manner of Wren"
- Barry Sheene (1950–2003), World Champion motorcycle racer. He spent his early years in Holborn.

== Gallery ==
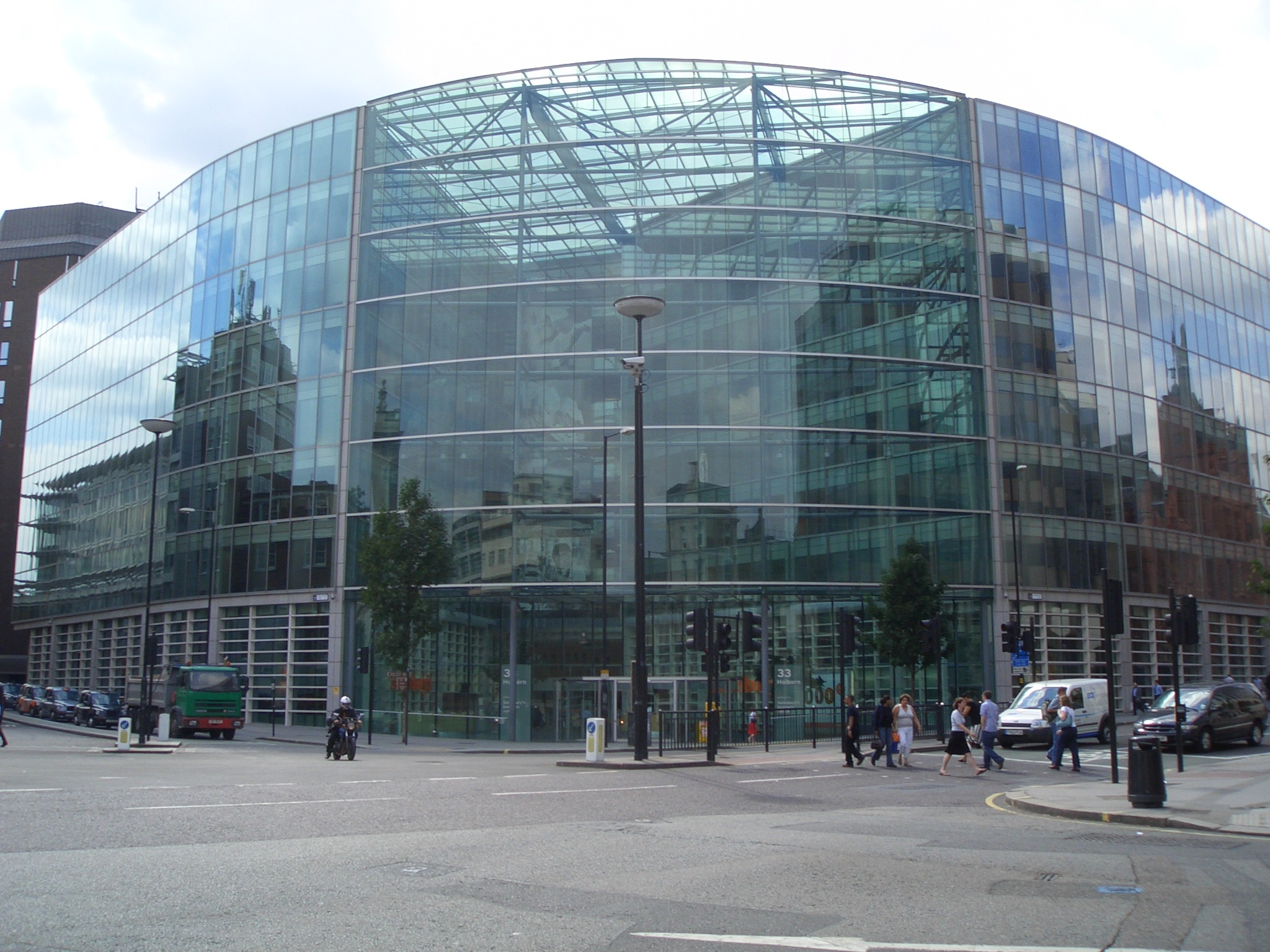
The headquarters of Sainsbury's at Holborn Circus

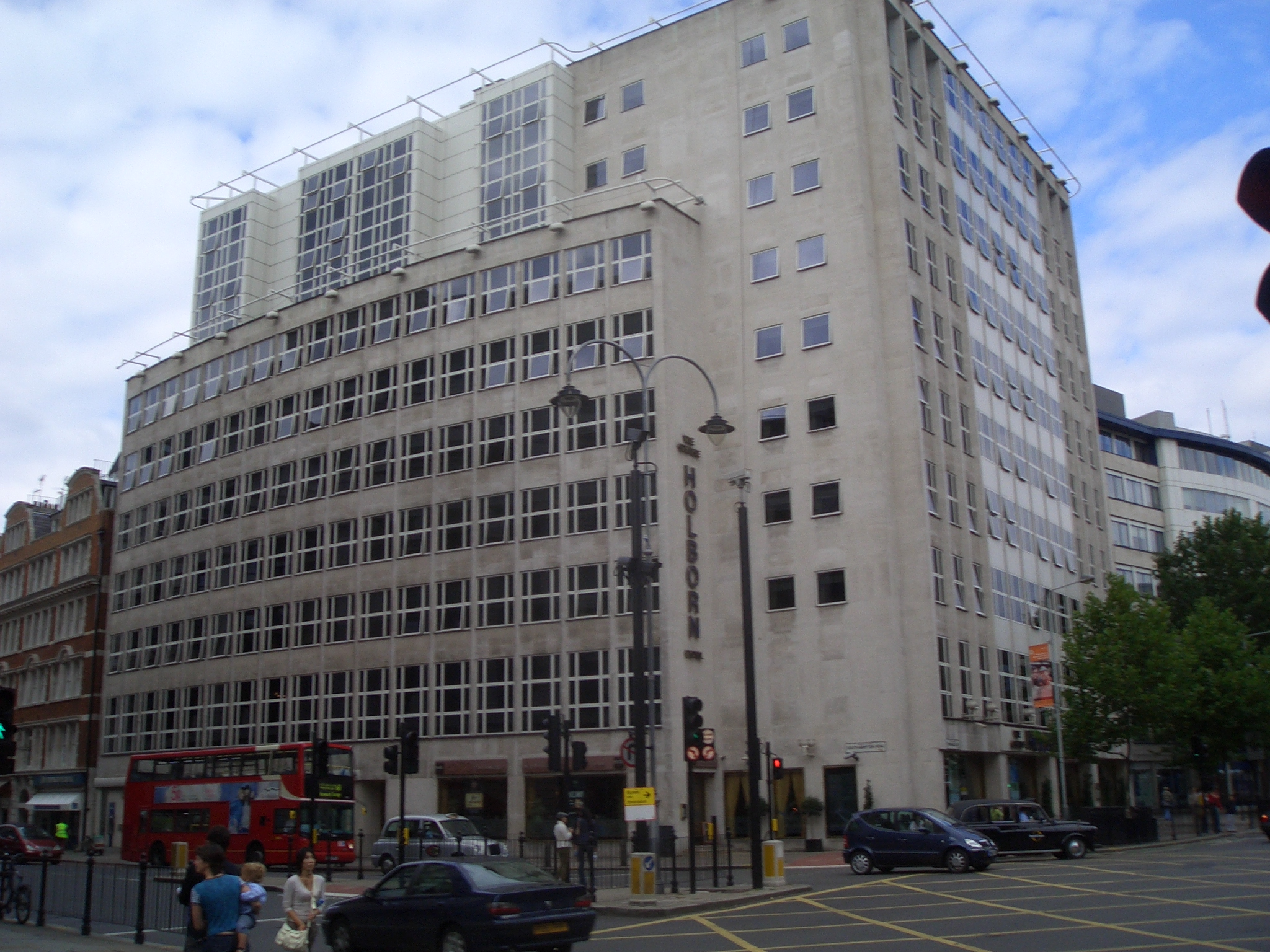
Grange Holborn Hotel

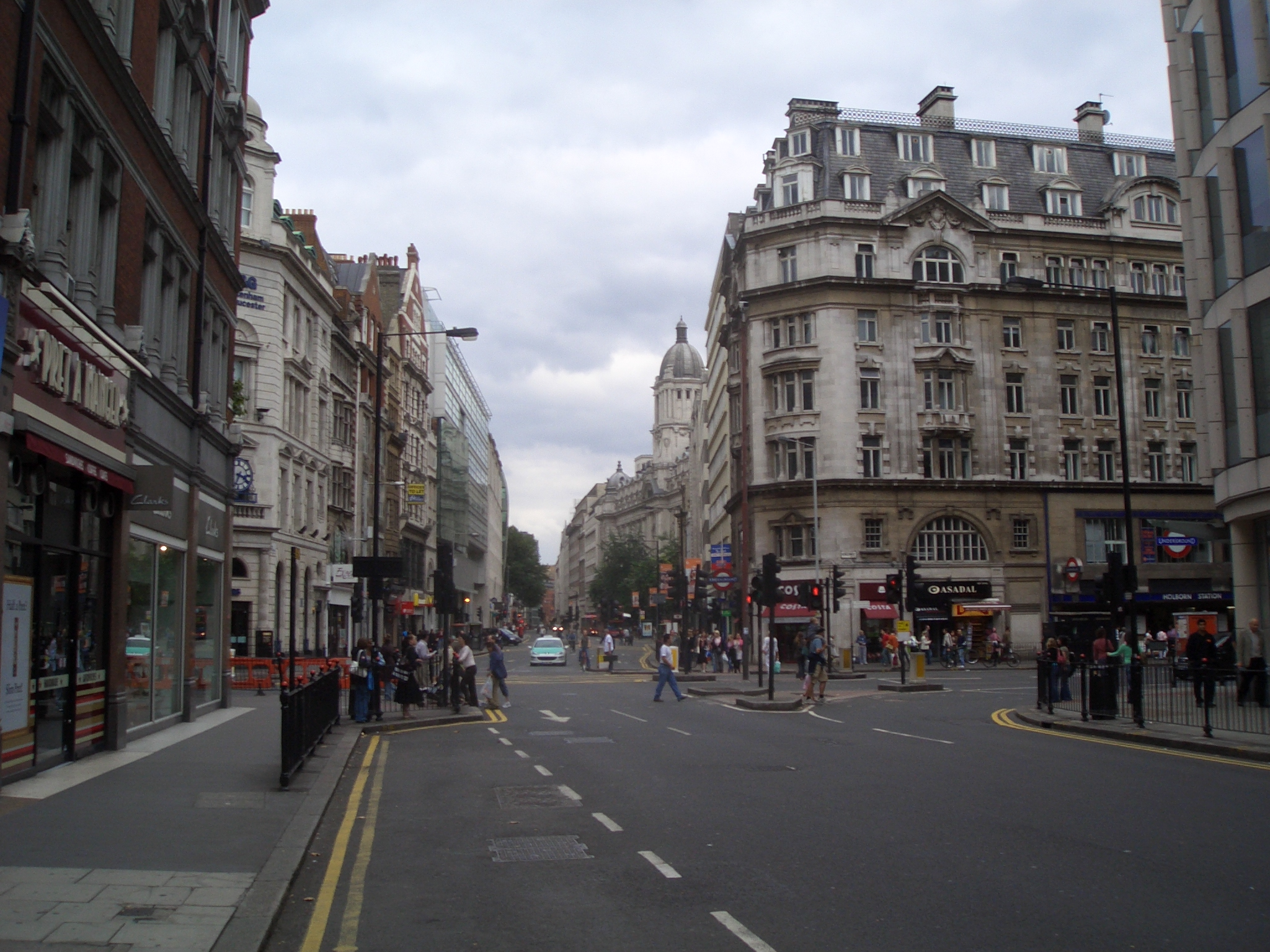
High Holborn

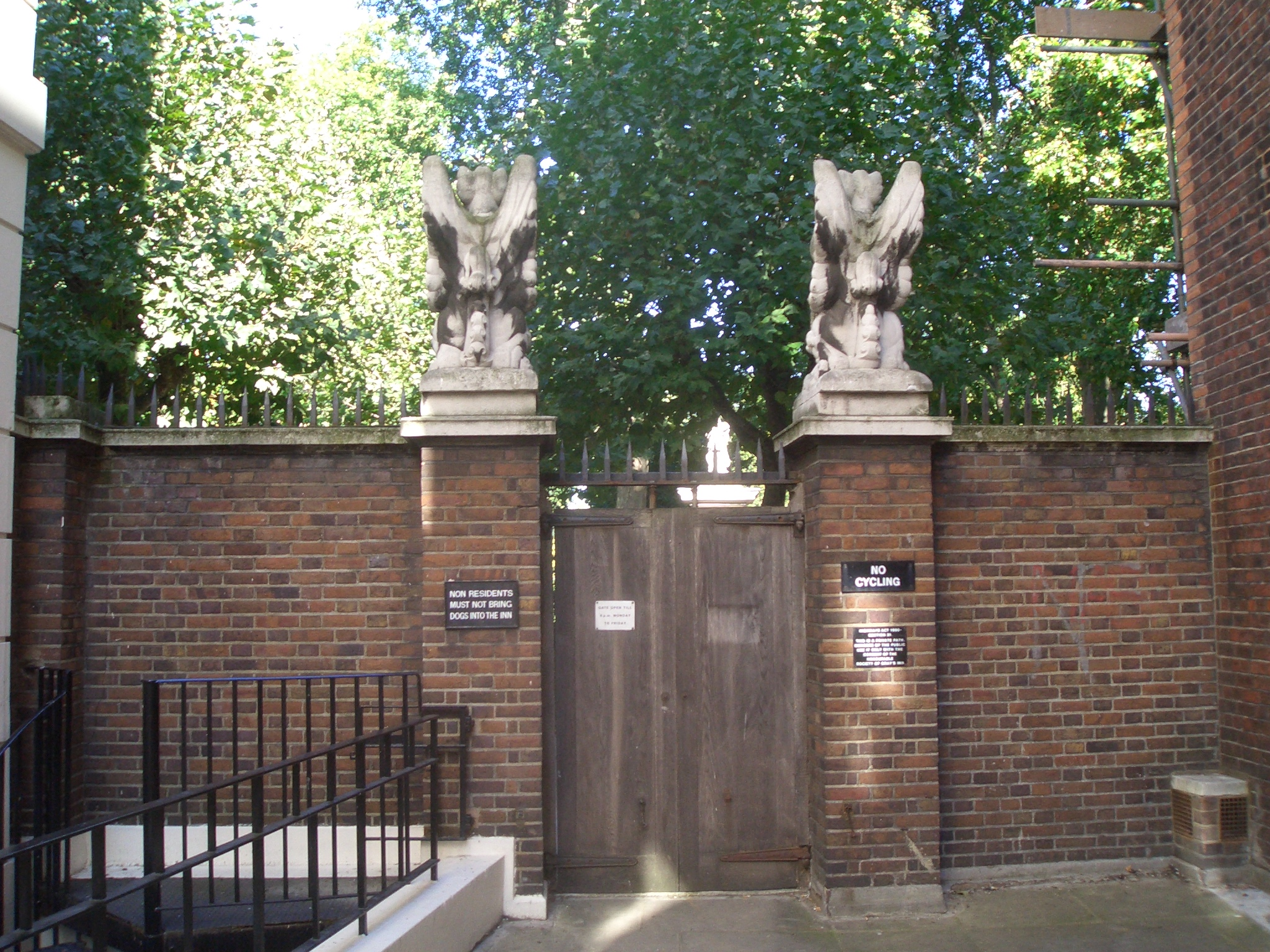
Entrance to Gray's Inn

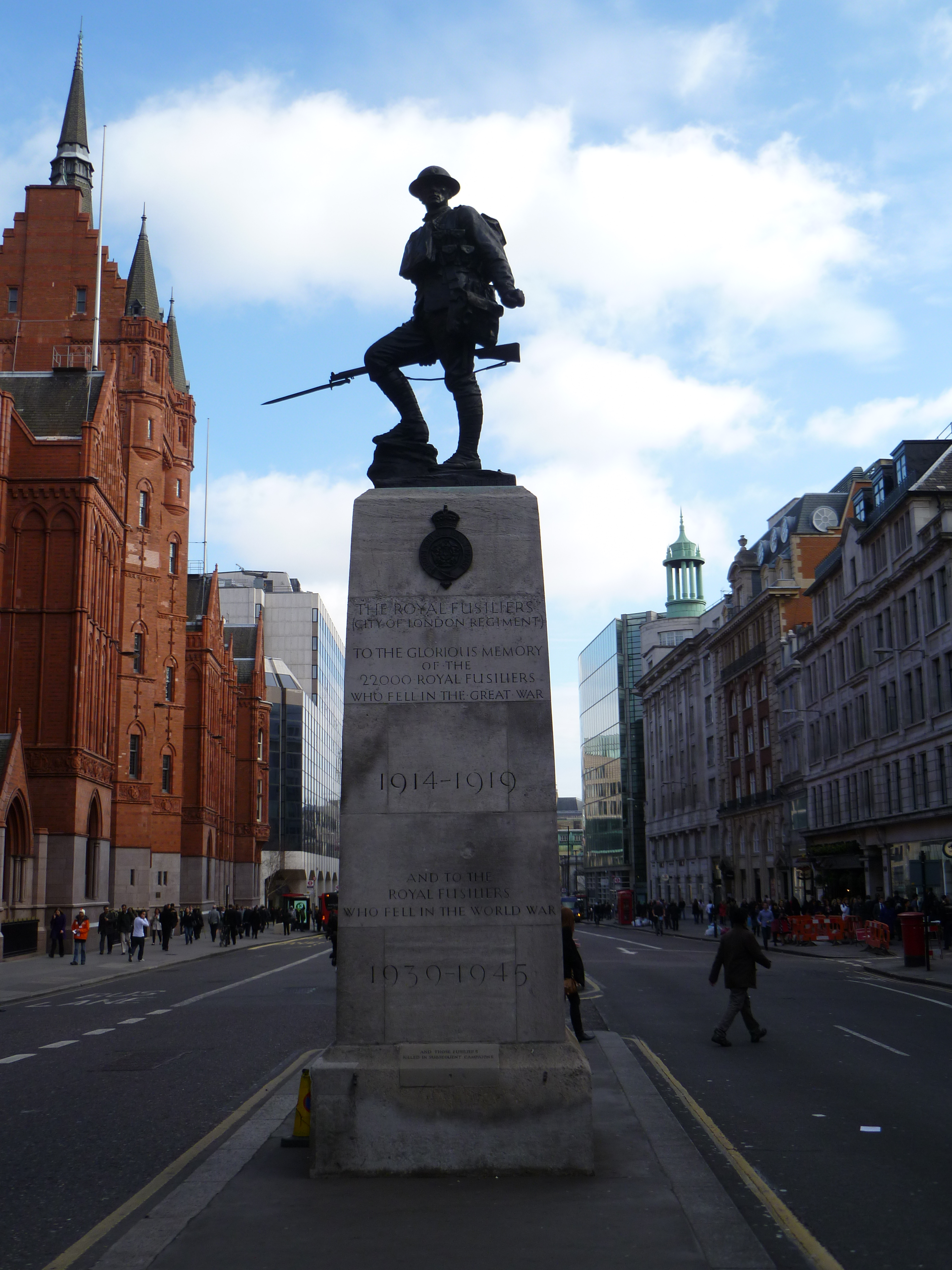
Royal London Fusiliers Monument on Holborn, dedicated to those who died in World War I

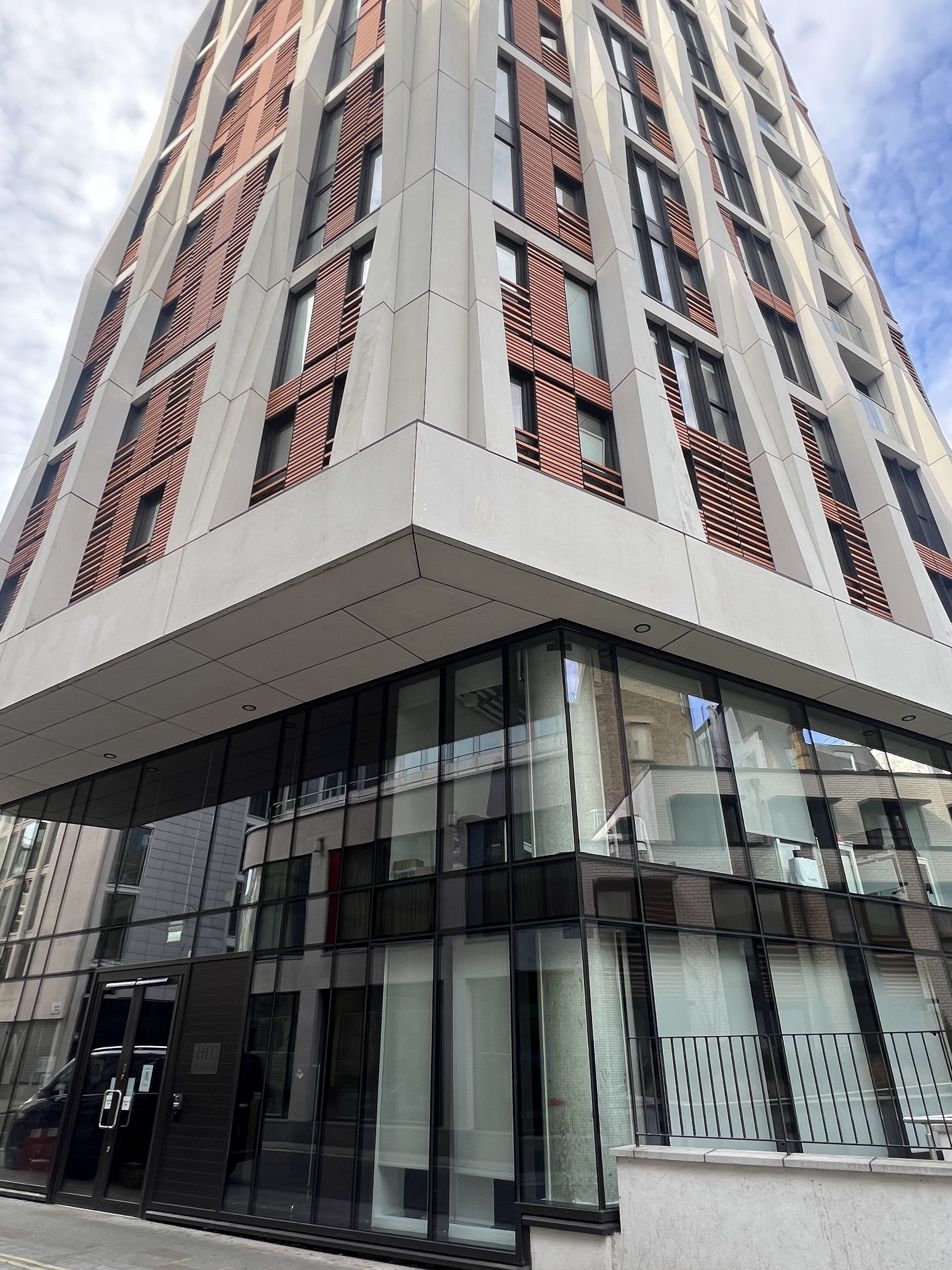
HEC UK House, Parker Street

== See also ==
- Holborn Circus

== Notes ==
- a. Pronunciation: The BBC Pronunciation Unit recommends "ˈhəʊbə(r)n" but allows "sometimes also hohl-buhrn". The organisation's less formal Pronouncing British Placenames notes, "You'll occasionally find towns where nobody can agree.... Holborn in central London has for many years been pronounced 'hoe-bun', but having so few local residents to preserve this, it's rapidly changing to a more natural 'hol-burn'". However, Modern British and American English pronunciation (2008) cites "Holborn" as one of its examples of a common word where the "l" is silent. The popular tourist guide The Rough Guide to Britain sticks to the traditional form, without "l".
