= 1945 London local elections =

Local elections in England

- 1 November 1945

All 1,377 councillors in all 28 metropolitan boroughs
	First party	Second party
Party	Labour	Municipal Reform
Councils	23	5
Councils +/–	▲6	▼6
Councillors	1,038	315

Local elections were held in London on 1 November 1945.

== Electoral arrangements ==
The County of London, outside of the City of London, was divided into 28 metropolitan boroughs. Each borough was divided into a number of multi-member electoral wards.

The previous election was in 1937. In the normal three-yearly cycle, elections should have taken place in 1940, 1943 and 1946. However, due to the Second World War, and the provisions of the Local Elections and Register of Electors (Temporary Provisions) Acts 1939–1944 and the Representation of the People Act 1945, the terms of those elected in 1937 were extended to 1945.

Councillors were elected for a three-year term, to go out of office in November 1948. However, the normal month of the 1948 and future borough council elections was changed to the following May by the Representation of the People Act 1948. Councillors elected in November 1945 had their terms extended to go out of office in May 1949.

The franchise was extended by the Representation of the People Act 1945 for this and future local elections to be on the same basis as Parliamentary elections.

== Results ==
The Conservative-aligned Municipal Reform Party lost control of six councils to the Labour Party.

The results for each borough were as follows:

Borough	Previous control	New control	Labour	Municipal Reform	Communist	Others	Total	Details
Battersea	Labour	Labour	49	6			55	
Bermondsey	Labour	Labour	51	3			54	Details
Bethnal Green	Labour	Labour	30				30	
Camberwell	Labour	Labour	51	9			60	
Chelsea	Municipal Reform	Municipal Reform	9	27			36	
Deptford	Labour	Labour	34	2			36	
Finsbury	Labour	Labour	47		1	8 (Note: 6 Ratepayers' association, 2 Genuine Labour.)	56	
Fulham	Labour	Labour	34	6			40	
Greenwich	Labour	Labour	23	7			30	
Hackney	Labour	Labour	47		1		48	
Hammersmith	Labour	Labour	36				36	
Hampstead	Municipal Reform	Municipal Reform	14	28			42	
Holborn	Municipal Reform	Labour	24 (Note: In Holborn the election was postponed until 27 November in one ward with nine seats due to the death of a candidate.)	18			42	
Islington	Labour	Labour	60				60	
Kensington	Municipal Reform	Municipal Reform	18	42			60	
Lambeth	Labour	Labour	57	3			60	
Lewisham	Municipal Reform	Labour	43	10			53	
Paddington	Municipal Reform	Labour	34	26			60	
Poplar	Labour	Labour	42				42	
Shoreditch	Labour	Labour	42				42	
Southwark	Labour	Labour	60				60	Details
Stepney	Labour	Labour	49		10	1 (Note: 1 Independent Labour.)	60	
St Marylebone	Municipal Reform	Municipal Reform	9	51			60	
Stoke Newington	Municipal Reform	Labour	30				30	
St Pancras	Municipal Reform	Labour	54	6			60	
Wandsworth	Municipal Reform	Labour	43	17			60	
Westminster	Municipal Reform	Municipal Reform	5	52	3		60	
Woolwich	Labour	Labour	43	2			45	
Total			1,038	315	15	10	1,377	
