= 1949 London local elections =

Local elections in England

- 12 May 1949

All 1,373 councillors in all 28 metropolitan boroughs
	First party	Second party
Party	Labour	Conservative
Councils	17	11
Councils +/–	▼6	▲6
Councillors	742	616

Local elections were held in London on 12 May 1949.

== Electoral arrangements ==
The County of London, outside of the City of London, was divided into 28 metropolitan boroughs. Each borough was divided into a number of multi-member electoral wards.

The elections were due to take place in November 1948. However, the normal month of this and future borough council elections was changed to the following May by the Representation of the People Act 1948. For councillors elected in 1949, terms were extended to four years. This was done so future triennial elections to the metropolitan borough councils and the London County Council would not take place in the same years.

Ward boundaries were changed in Battersea, Chelsea, Hammersmith (36 councillors increased to 39), Lewisham (53 to 55), Shoreditch (42 reduced to 33) and Wandsworth. Total councillors were reduced by 4 from 1,377 to 1,373.

== Results ==
The Conservatives regained control of six councils, Holborn, Lewisham, Paddington, Stoke Newington, St Pancras and Wandsworth, that they had lost at the previous election.

The results for each borough were as follows:

Borough	Previous control	New control	Labour	Conservative	Communist	Ind. Labour	Total	Details
Battersea	Labour	Labour	34	21			55	
Bermondsey	Labour	Labour	54				54	Details
Bethnal Green	Labour	Labour	30				30	
Camberwell	Labour	Labour	39	21			60	
Chelsea	Municipal Reform	Conservative	4	32			36	
Deptford	Labour	Labour	29	7			36	
Finsbury	Labour	Labour	37	16		3	56	
Fulham	Labour	Labour	21	19			40	
Greenwich	Labour	Labour	21	9			30	
Hackney	Labour	Labour	38 (Note: In Hackney the election was postponed until 15 June for one ward with three seats due to the death of a candidate.)	8	2		48	
Hammersmith	Labour	Labour	27	12			39 (Note: The number of councillors elected in Hammersmith was increased from 36 to 39.)	
Hampstead	Municipal Reform	Conservative	2	40			42	
Holborn	Labour	Conservative	1	41			42	
Islington	Labour	Labour	48	12			60	
Kensington	Municipal Reform	Conservative	12	48			60	
Lambeth	Labour	Labour	41	19			60	
Lewisham	Labour	Conservative	11	44			55 (Note: The number of councillors elected in Lewisham was increased from 53 to 55.)	
Paddington	Labour	Conservative	20	40			60	
Poplar	Labour	Labour	42				42	
Shoreditch	Labour	Labour	33				33 (Note: The number of councillors elected in Shoreditch was reduced from 42 to 33.)	
Southwark	Labour	Labour	60				60	Details
Stepney	Labour	Labour	50		9	1	60	
St Marylebone	Municipal Reform	Conservative	9	51			60	
Stoke Newington	Labour	Conservative	7	23			30	
St Pancras	Labour	Conservative	26	34			60	
Wandsworth	Labour	Conservative	10	50			60	
Westminster	Municipal Reform	Conservative		60			60	
Woolwich	Labour	Labour	36	9			45	
Total			742	616	11	4	1,373	
