= St Andrew Holborn (parish) =

Ancient parish of London, England

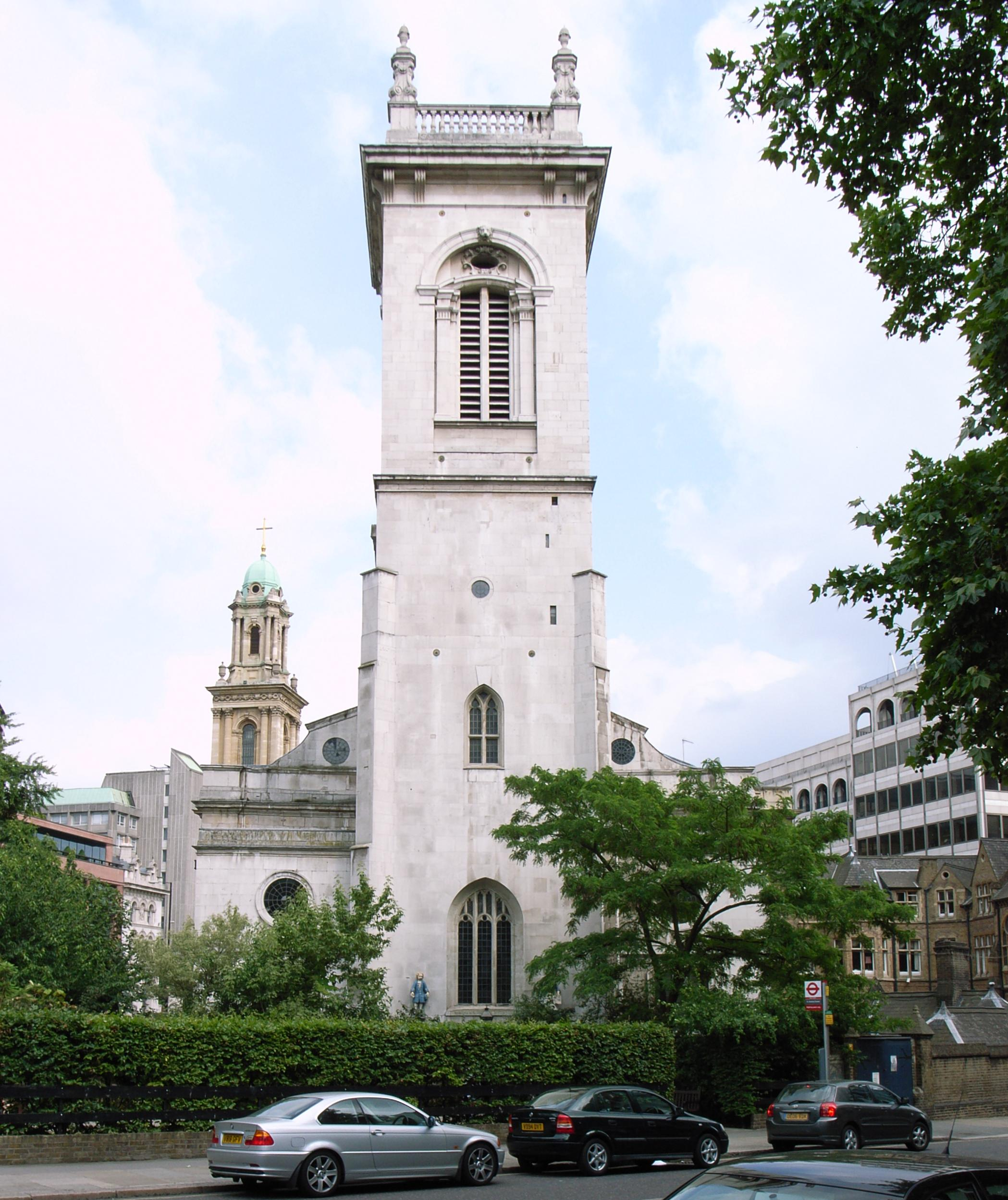
- History
  - Origin: Ancient parish
  - Abolished: 1907
  - Succeeded by: Reduced 1723: see St George the Martyr; Reduced 1767: see St Andrew Holborn Above the Bars with St George the Martyr above both de facto largely replaced in 1855 by Holborn District. Remaining Below the Bars element gradually replaced in importance by Farringdon Without Ward of the City, de facto. De jure replaced as the whole of the City of London was constituted a civil parish 1907 until abolished in 1965.
- Status: Civil parish

St Andrew Holborn was an ancient English parish that until 1767 was partly in the City of London and mainly in the county of Middlesex. Its City, thus southern, part retained its former name or was sometimes officially referred to as St Andrew Holborn Below the Bars. At the 1901 census (the last before the abolition of the parish), St Andrew Holborn had a population of 1365.

== History ==
=== Ecclesiastical origins ===
Thavie's original property, which was left for his endowment of the church, Thavie's Inn became a lawyers inn and may have been the original home of Lincoln's Inn before it relocated to its present site. Lincoln's sold Thavie's Inn for redevelopment in 1785. Earlier that century the small east stained-glass window was put up, representing the arms of John Thavie, Esq., who in the year 1348 "left a considerable estate towards the support of this fabric for ever" as its caption reads.

Under an Act of Parliament passed in the reign of Queen Anne and [related proceedings] the parish of St. George the Martyr, Queen Square, which before had formed part of St. Andrew's, Holborn, was erected into a distinct parish for spiritual purposes, although still united with St. Andrew's as regards the poor, and other secular matters.

— Thornbury, Old London, New London 1878

Four other new smaller parishes took over the largest green area depicted and most of Gray's Inn:

- St John the Evangelist Red Lion Square took on the south-west, eating equally into St Giles in the Fields
- St Alban, Brooke Street was rectangular parish (less small Furnival's Inn) spread from tiny Brooke Street Street to the south side of Clerkenwell Road: Reids Brewery, a Crown Court and Holborn Town Hall.
- Holy Trinity, Gray's Inn Road occupied Bedford Row and the north-to-northeast quarter which thus ran from Lambs Conduit to Back Hill at the start of Hatton Garden
- Saffron Hill, Hatton Garden, Ely Rents and Ely Place, extra-parochial liberties covering the east were covered by a new church to St Peter.

Newcourt informs us that a public grammar school was among the adjuncts of the church. It was one of those erected by Act of Parliament in the reign of Henry VI. and, according to Maitland, stood on the right side of the church, and was taken down in 1737.

=== Civil parishes (as regards secular matters) ===
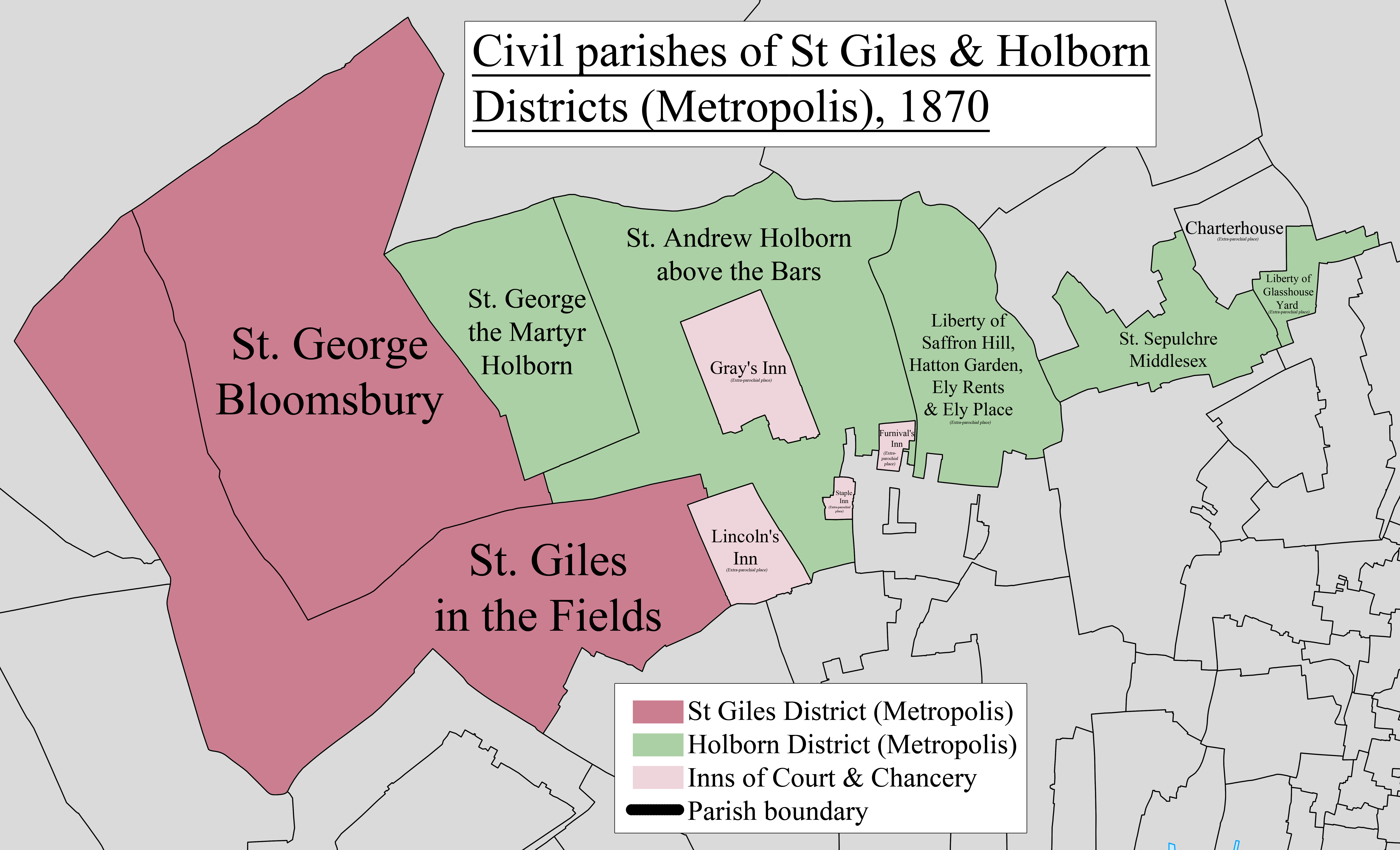

In 1723 the Middlesex bulk of the ecclesiastical parish was first split: its north-west corner became St George the Martyr, Queen Square (not to be confused with St George, Bloomsbury to the immediate west) and the rest remained St Andrew, Holborn. The two however recombined for civic, secular purposes in 1767 to create St Andrew Holborn Above the Bars with St George the Martyr; the latter at approximately the same time shed its part in the City of London to become its own parish as to lay purposes: St Andrew Holborn Below the Bars and over time under the auspices of the Farringdon Without City Ward.

Both parishes bore quasi-civil parish (CP) areas separate from their parochial church councils. By comparison and not to be confused St Giles in the Fields and St George Bloomsbury Ancient Parish-turned Civil Parish existed 1774-1930. St Andrew Holborn Below the Bars existed abolished as a civil parish 1767-1907 when it was merged to form London parish.

== Geography ==
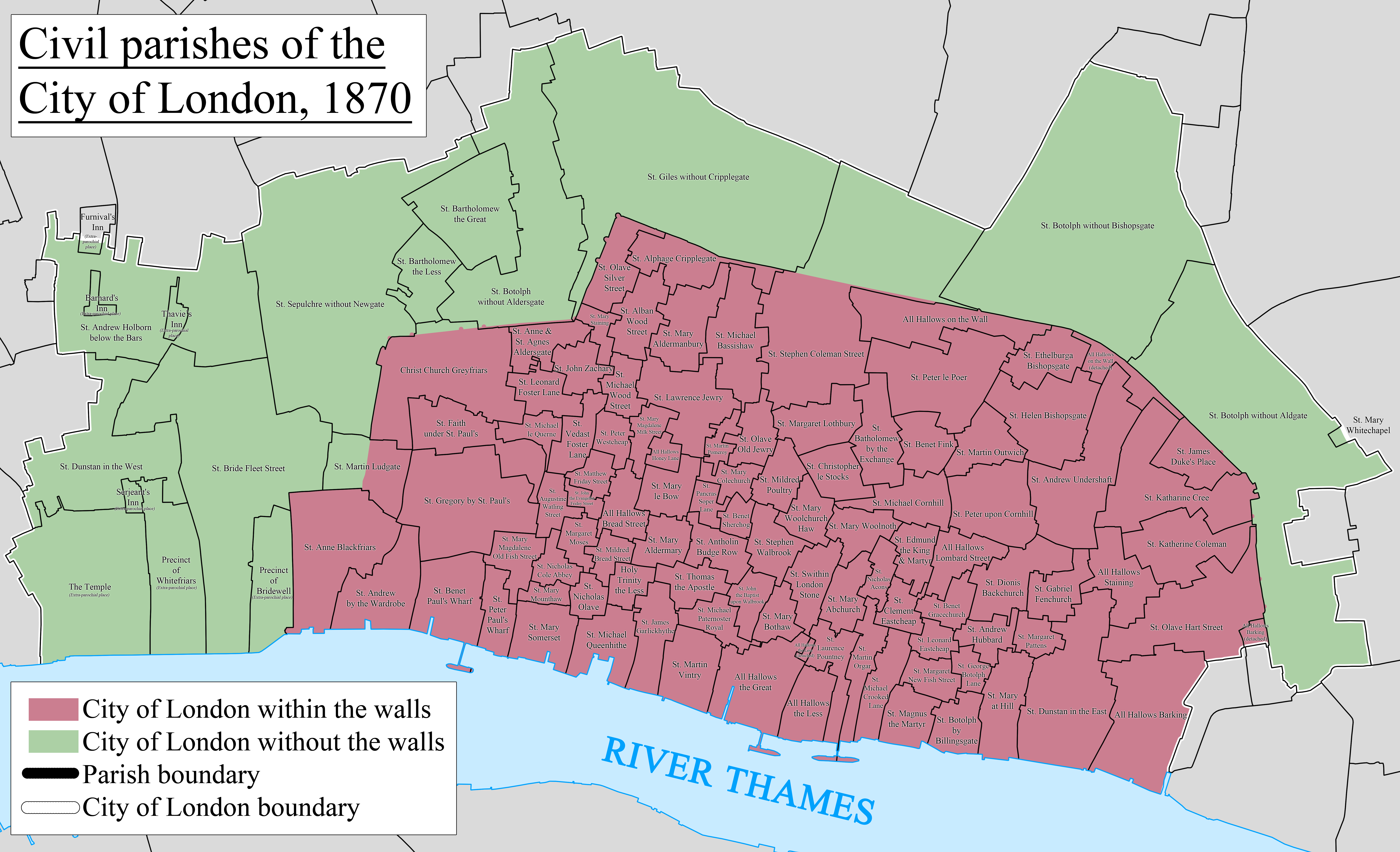
The ancient parish included most of the Holborn area to the west, bordering onto St Giles in the Fields. As such it included both Lincoln's Inn and Gray's Inn which rented pews in the church of St Andrew, Holborn, first mentioned according to Thornbury's Old and New London (1878) "given by one Gladerinus to the Dean and Chapter of St. Paul's"; rebuilt to Wren's designs in 1686.

== Population ==
St Andrew Holborn, City of London

Year	1871	1881	1891	1901
Population	3,818	2,883	2,570	1,365
