= 1937 London local elections =

Local elections in England

- 1 November 1937

All 1,377 councillors in all 28 metropolitan boroughs
	First party	Second party
Party	Labour	Municipal Reform
Councils	17	11
Councils +/–	▲2	▼2
Councillors	778	598

Local elections were held in London on 1 November 1937.

== Electoral arrangements ==
The County of London, outside of the City of London, was divided into 28 metropolitan boroughs. Each borough was divided into a number of multi-member electoral wards.

Councillors were elected for a three-year term, to go out of office in November 1940. However, due to the Second World War, and the provisions of the Local Elections and Register of Electors (Temporary Provisions) Acts 1939–1944 and the Representation of the People Act 1945, the terms of those elected in 1937 were extended to 1945.

Ward boundaries were changed in Hackney (60 councillors decreased to 48), Lewisham (50 increased to 53) and Southwark. Total councillors were reduced by 9 from 1,386 to 1,377.

== Results ==
Labour took control of two councils, Hammersmith and Lambeth, from the Conservative-aligned Municipal Reform Party.

The results for each borough were as follows:

Borough	Previous control	New control	Labour	Municipal Reform (Note: Includes all Conservative Party-aligned candidates who stood as Municipal Reform or another name.)	Communist	Total	Details
Battersea	Labour	Labour	40	15		55	
Bermondsey	Labour	Labour	54			54	Details
Bethnal Green	Labour	Labour	30			30	
Camberwell	Labour	Labour	38	22		60	
Chelsea	Municipal Reform	Municipal Reform		36		36	
Deptford	Labour	Labour	30	6		36	
Finsbury	Labour	Labour	48	8		56	
Fulham	Labour	Labour	27	13		40	
Greenwich	Labour	Labour	21	9		30	
Hackney	Labour	Labour	41	7		48	
Hammersmith	Municipal Reform	Labour	27	9		36	
Hampstead	Municipal Reform	Municipal Reform	6	36		42	
Holborn	Municipal Reform	Municipal Reform	6	36		42	
Islington	Labour	Labour	42	18		60	
Kensington	Municipal Reform	Municipal Reform	12	48		60	
Lambeth	Municipal Reform	Labour	31	29		60	
Lewisham	Municipal Reform	Municipal Reform	11	42		53	
Paddington	Municipal Reform	Municipal Reform	23	37		60	
Poplar	Labour	Labour	42			42	
Shoreditch	Labour	Labour	36	6		42	
Southwark	Labour	Labour	60			60	Details
Stepney	Labour	Labour	59		1	60	
St Marylebone	Municipal Reform	Municipal Reform	9	51		60	
Stoke Newington	Municipal Reform	Municipal Reform	13	17		30	
St Pancras	Municipal Reform	Municipal Reform	27	33		60	
Wandsworth	Municipal Reform	Municipal Reform	10	50		60	
Westminster	Municipal Reform	Municipal Reform		60		60	
Woolwich	Labour	Labour	35	10		45	
Total			778	598	1	1,377	
