= 1956 Bermondsey Borough Council election =

Local election in England

Elections to the Metropolitan Borough of Bermondsey were held in 1956.

The borough had 13 wards which returned between 3 and 5 members. Of the 13 wards 6 of the wards had all candidates elected unopposed. Labour won all the seats, the Conservatives only stood in 4 wards, the Liberal Party 1 ward and the Communist Party 1 ward.

== Election result ==
Bermondsey Borough Election Result 1956
Party	Seats	Gains	Losses	Net gain/loss	Seats %	Votes %	Votes	+/−
Labour	45				100.0			
Conservative	0				0.0			
Liberal	0				0.0			
Communist	0				0.0			

Preceded by 1953 Bermondsey Borough election	Southwark local elections	Succeeded by 1959 Bermondsey Borough election
