= 1962 Bermondsey Borough Council election =

English election

Elections to the Metropolitan Borough of Bermondsey were held in 1962. These were the last elections before the borough became part of the London Borough of Southwark in 1965.

The borough had 13 wards which returned between 3 and 5 members. Of the 13 wards 9 of the wards had all candidates elected unopposed. Labour won all the seats and the Conservatives, the only opposition, only stood in 4 wards.

== Election result ==
Bermondsey Borough Election Result 1962
Party	Seats	Gains	Losses	Net gain/loss	Seats %	Votes %	Votes	+/−
Labour	45				100.0			
Conservative	0				0.0			

Preceded by 1959 Bermondsey Borough election	Southwark local elections	Succeeded by 1964 Southwark Council election
