= Saffron Hill, Hatton Garden, Ely Rents and Ely Place =

Coordinates: 51.520°N 0.108°W

Liberty of Saffron Hill Hatton Garden Ely Rents and Ely Place
- Civil parish
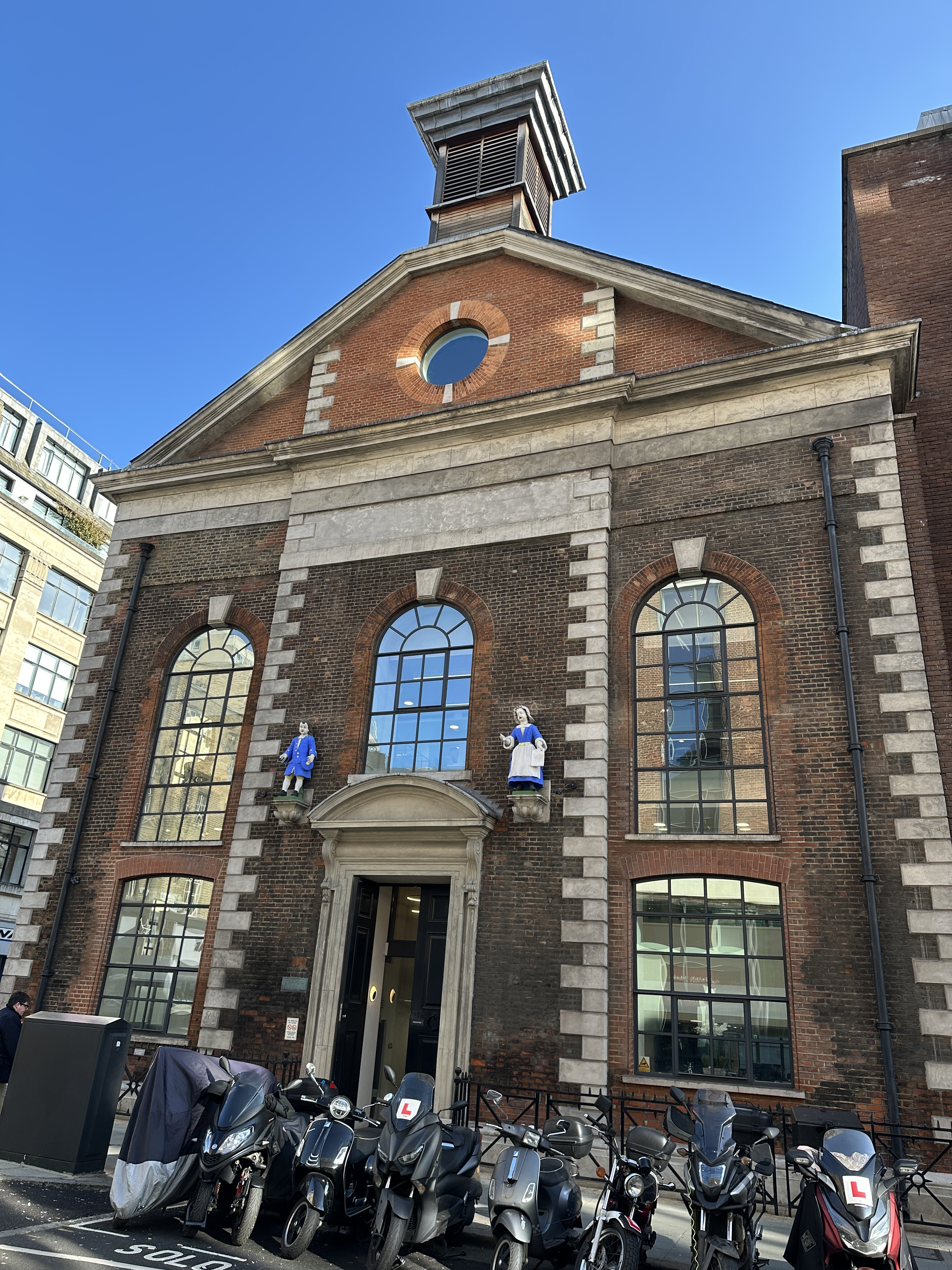

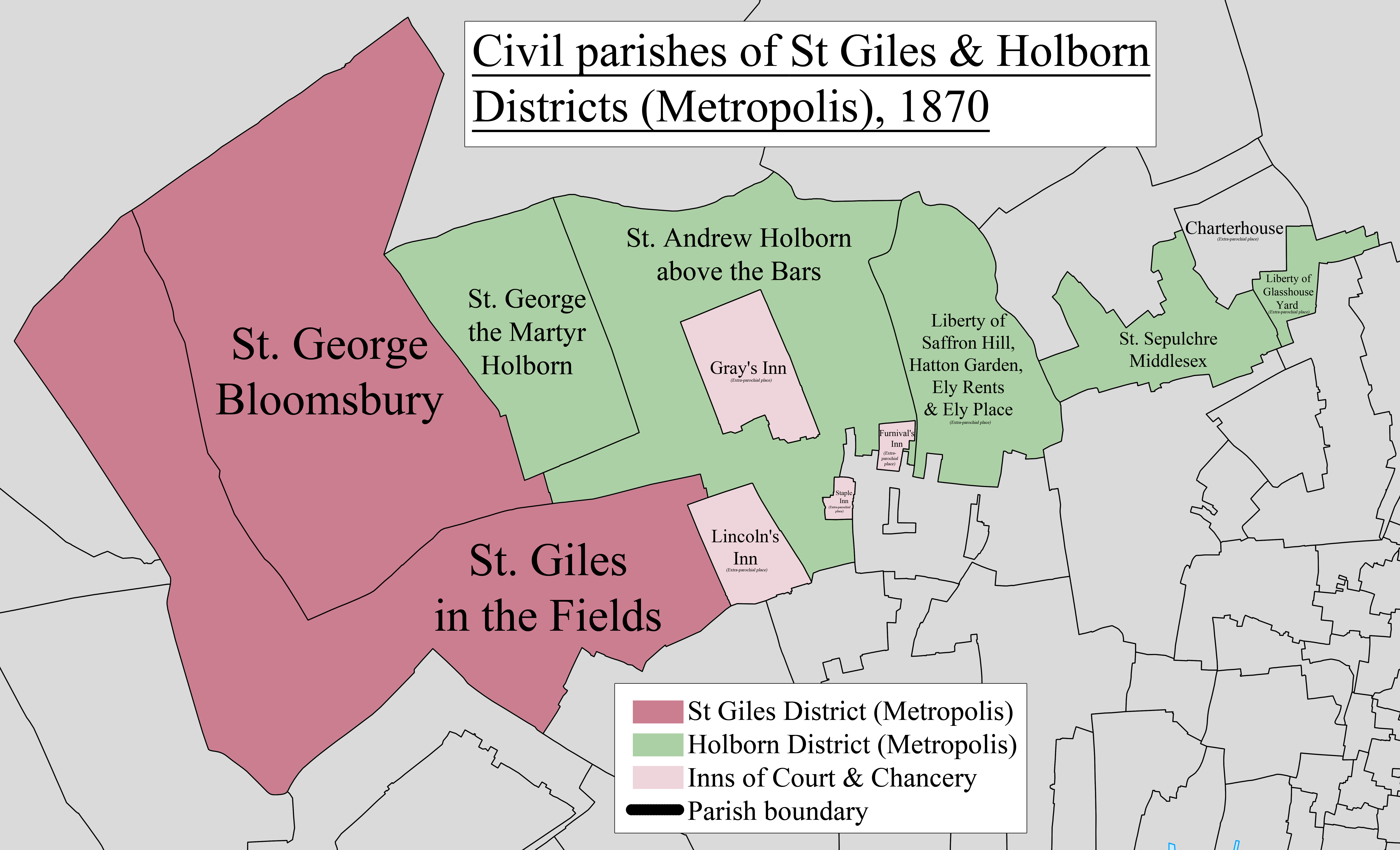
- Area
  - 1921: 30 acres (0.12 km^{2})
- Population
  - 1921: 825
- History
  - Abolished: 30 March 1930
  - Succeeded by: Holborn

Saffron Hill, Hatton Garden, Ely Rents and Ely Place boundaries in 1851

Saffron Hill, Hatton Garden, Ely Rents and Ely Place was a liberty and from 1866 to 1930 a civil parish in the metropolitan area of London, England. It was part of the ancient parish of St Andrew Holborn. At the 1921 census (one of the last before the abolition of the parish), Liberty of Saffron Hill Hatton Garden Ely Rents and Ely Place had a population of 825.

The southern boundary was the street now called Holborn, the western boundary was Leather Lane. It stretched north of Clerkenwell Road between Back Hill and Herbal Hill to the current junction of Warner Street and Ray Street. The boundary in the east approximated Farringdon Road and Farringdon Street. It included the entire lengths of the streets now called Saffron Hill, Hatton Garden and Ely Place. Ely Rents was a group of houses owned by the See of Ely.

The liberty had a workhouse from 1730 and was grouped into the Holborn Poor Law Union in 1836.

It occupied an area of 30 acres and the population was as follows:

Year	1801	1811	1821	1831	1841	1851	1881	1891	1901	1911	1921
Population	7,781	7,482	9,270	9,745	9,455	8,728	3,980	4,506	2,561	1,733	825

For local government it was grouped into the Holborn District from 1855 to 1900 and then became part of the Metropolitan Borough of Holborn.

The liberty was abolished in 1889, when the Local Government Act 1888 merged remaining liberties into their surrounding counties. The liberty had been surrounded by Middlesex, but the 1888 act created a new County of London in the metropolitan area and it became part of the new county instead. The civil parish was abolished on 31 March 1930 to form Holborn.
