= Holborn District (Metropolis) =

Holborn
- Board of works district
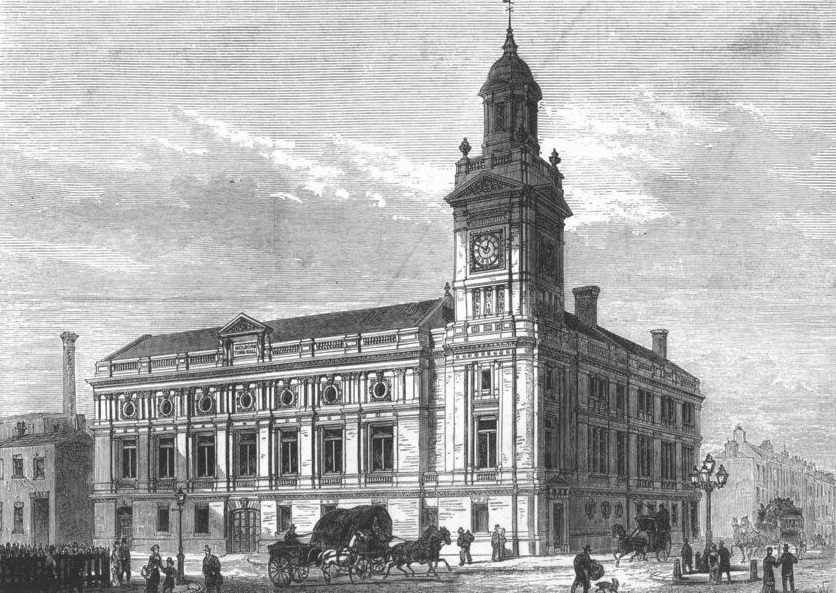
- Old Holborn Town Hall on Gray's Inn Road

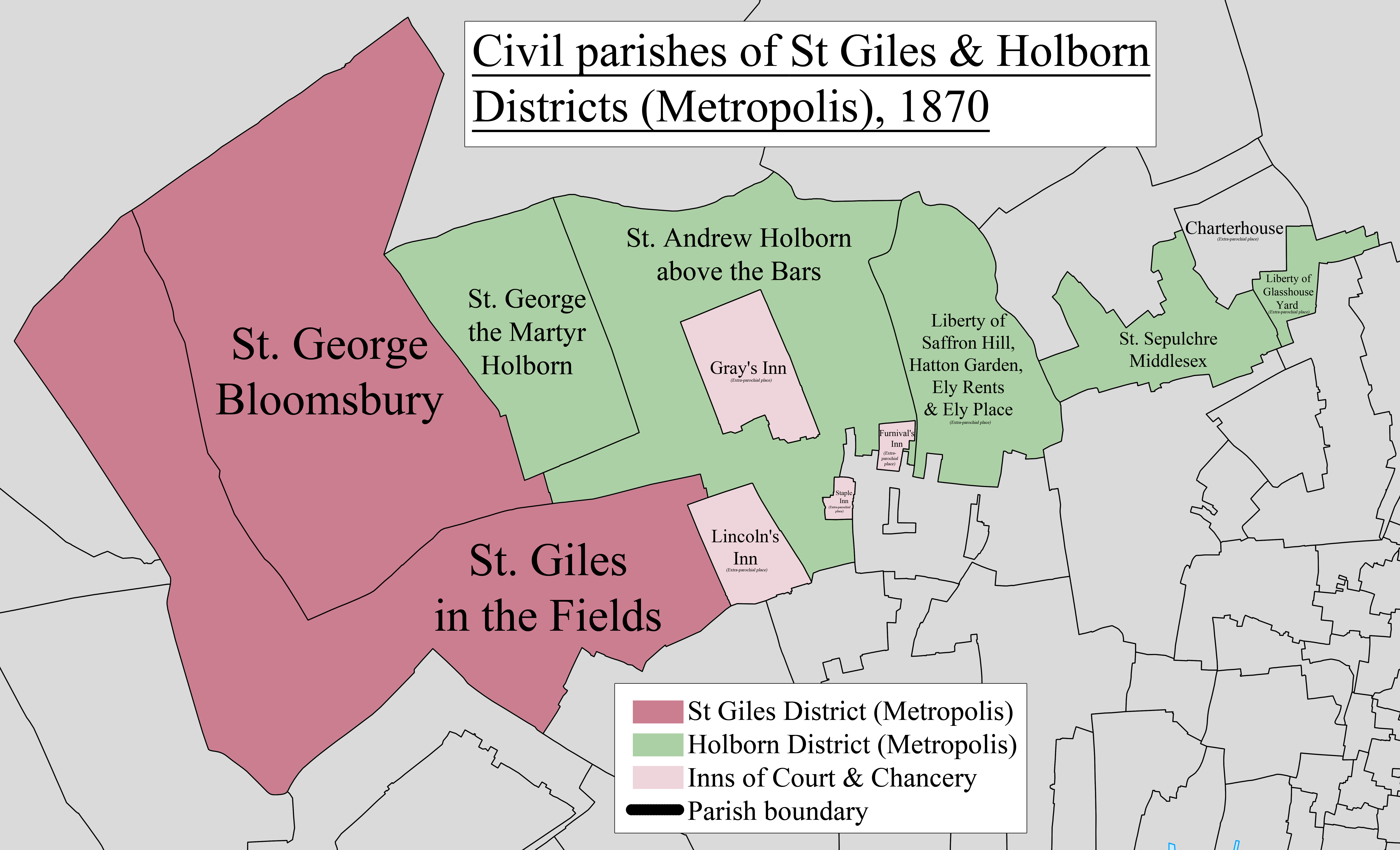
- Area
  - 1861: 167 acres (0.68 km^{2})
  - 1871: 167 acres (0.68 km^{2})
  - 1881: 167 acres (0.68 km^{2})
  - 1891: 168 acres (0.68 km^{2})
- Population
  - 1861: 45,463
  - 1871: 43,520
  - 1881: 36,189
  - 1891: 33,485
- History
  - Created: 1855
  - Abolished: 1900
  - Succeeded by: Metropolitan Borough of Holborn; Metropolitan Borough of Finsbury
- Status: Board of works district
- Government: Holborn District Board of Works
  - HQ: Holborn Town Hall, Gray's Inn Road

Holborn was a local government district in the metropolitan area of London to the north west of the City of London from 1855 to 1900.

The district was formed by the Metropolis Management Act 1855 from the following Middlesex civil parishes and places:

- The Liberty of Glasshouse Yard
- The Liberty of Saffron Hill, Hatton Garden, Ely Rents and Ely Place
- St Andrew Holborn Above the Bars with St George the Martyr
- St Sepulchre Middlesex

== District board ==
The district was governed by the Holborn District Board of Works, which consisted of forty-nine elected vestrymen: twenty-four elected for the parish of St Andrew Holborn above Bars; nine for St George the Martyr; nine for Saffron Hill, Hatton Garden, Ely Rents, and Ely Place; six for St Sepulchre and one for Glasshouse Yard. The first elections were held in November 1855, when the entire membership of the board was elected. Thereafter elections for one third of the seats were held in May, beginning in the year 1857.

Holborn District was originally within the area of responsibility of the Metropolitan Board of Works and nominated one member to the MBW. In 1889 the area of the Metropolitan Board became the County of London, and Holborn District Board of Works became a local council under the London County Council.

The Board of Works was administered from the old Holborn Town Hall, Gray's Inn Road.

== Abolition ==
The district was abolished in 1900, when the County of London was divided into twenty-eight metropolitan boroughs. A new Metropolitan Borough of Holborn was created by the merger of Holborn District (less Glasshouse Yard and St Sepulchre) with the neighbouring St Giles District along with two of the Inns of Court: Lincoln's Inn and Staple Inn. Glasshouse Yard and St Sepulchre became part of the Metropolitan Borough of Finsbury.
