= 1953 Bermondsey Borough Council election =

Local election in England

Elections to the Metropolitan Borough of Bermondsey were held in 1953.

The borough had 13 wards which returned between three and five members. Of the 13 wards four of the wards had all candidates elected unopposed. Labour won all the seats, the Conservatives only stood in five wards, the Liberal Party in three wards and an independent in one ward.

== Election result ==
Bermondsey Borough Election Result 1953
Party	Seats	Gains	Losses	Net gain/loss	Seats %	Votes %	Votes	+/−
Labour	45				100.0			
Conservative	0				0.0			
Liberal	0				0.0			
Independent	0				0.0			

Preceded by 1949 Bermondsey Borough election	Southwark local elections	Succeeded by 1956 Bermondsey Borough election
