= 1945 Bermondsey Borough Council election =

Local election in England

Elections to the Metropolitan Borough of Bermondsey were held in 1945.

The borough had 12 wards which returned between 3 and 6 members. Of the 12 wards 2 of the wards had all candidates elected unopposed. Labour won all the seats except one ward. The Conservatives standing as Municipal Reform won one ward.

== Election result ==
Bermondsey Borough Election Result 1945
Party	Seats	Gains	Losses	Net gain/loss	Seats %	Votes %	Votes	+/−
Labour	51							–
Municipal Reform	3							
Liberal	0				0.0			
Independent Municipal Party	0				0.0			
Communist	0				0.0			

Preceded by 1937 Bermondsey Borough election	Southwark local elections	Succeeded by 1949 Bermondsey Borough election
