= St Andrew Holborn Above the Bars with St George the Martyr =

Former civil parish in London, England

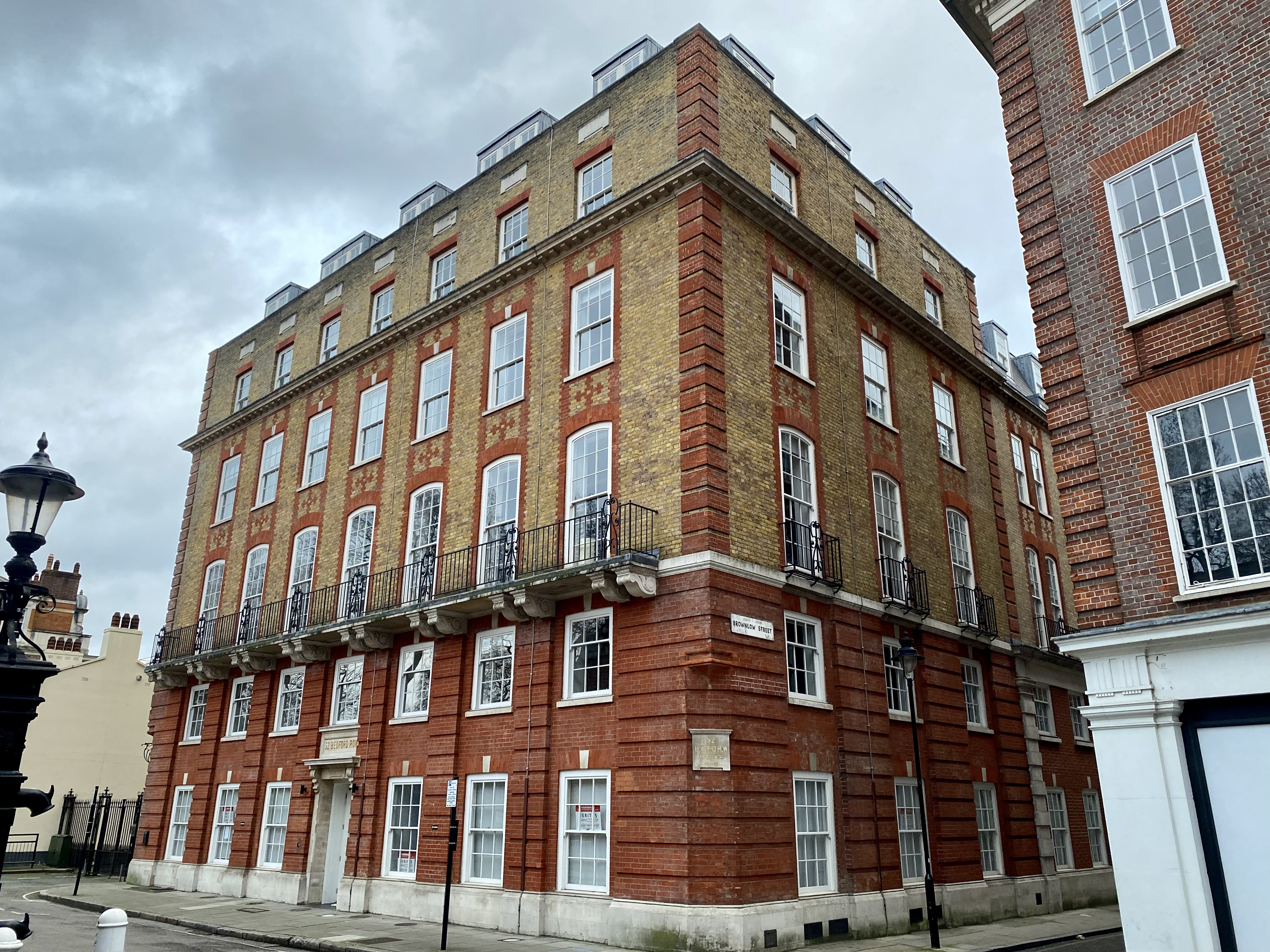

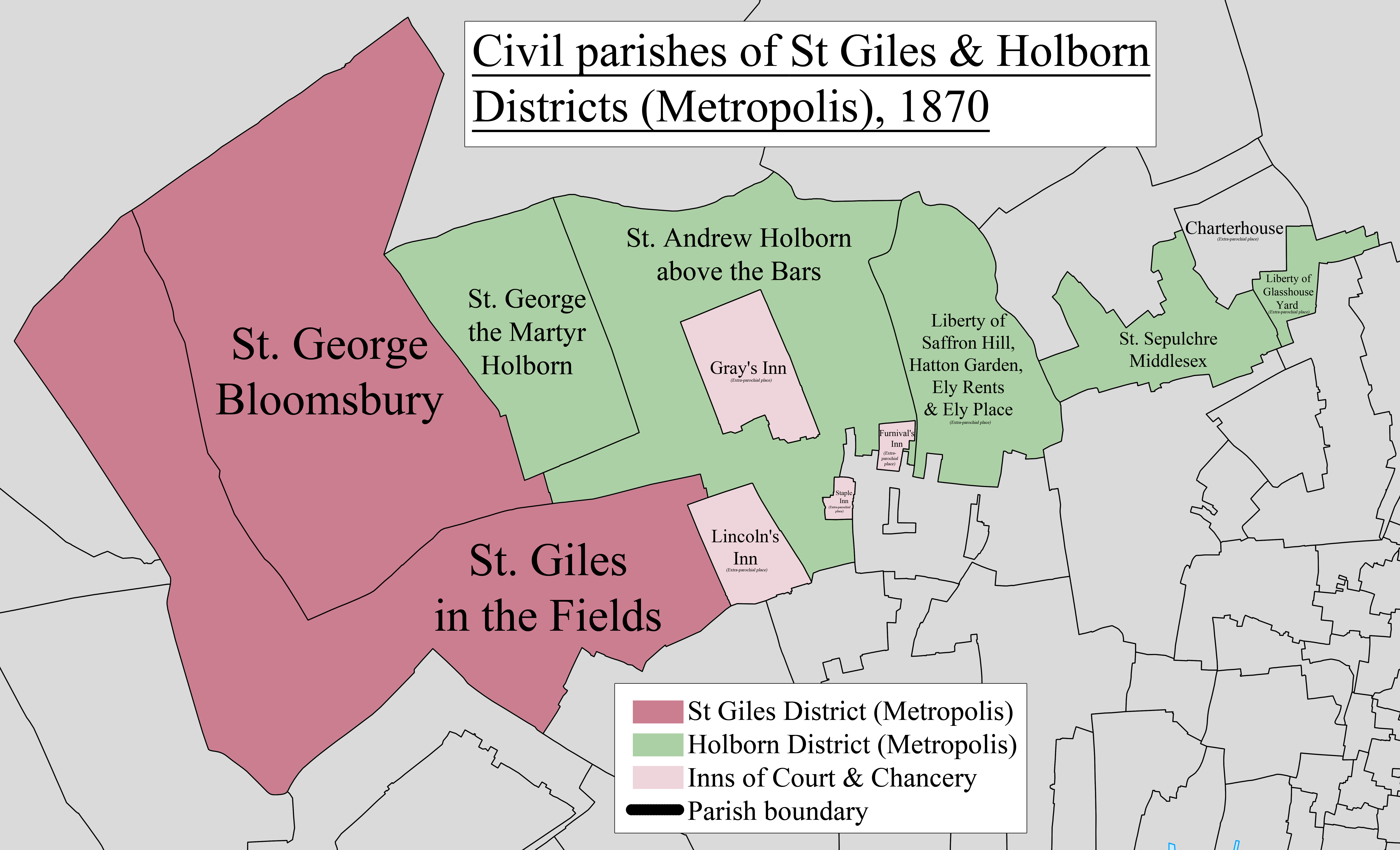
- Area
  - 1851: 75 acres
  - 1891: 111 acres
  - 1921: 118 acres
- Population
  - 1851: 23,355
  - 1891: 26,228
  - 1921: 19,224
- Density
  - 1851: 311/acre
  - 1891: 236/acre
  - 1921: 163/acre
- History
  - Origin: St Andrew Holborn
  - Created: 1767
  - Abolished: 1930
  - Succeeded by: Holborn
- Status: Civil parish
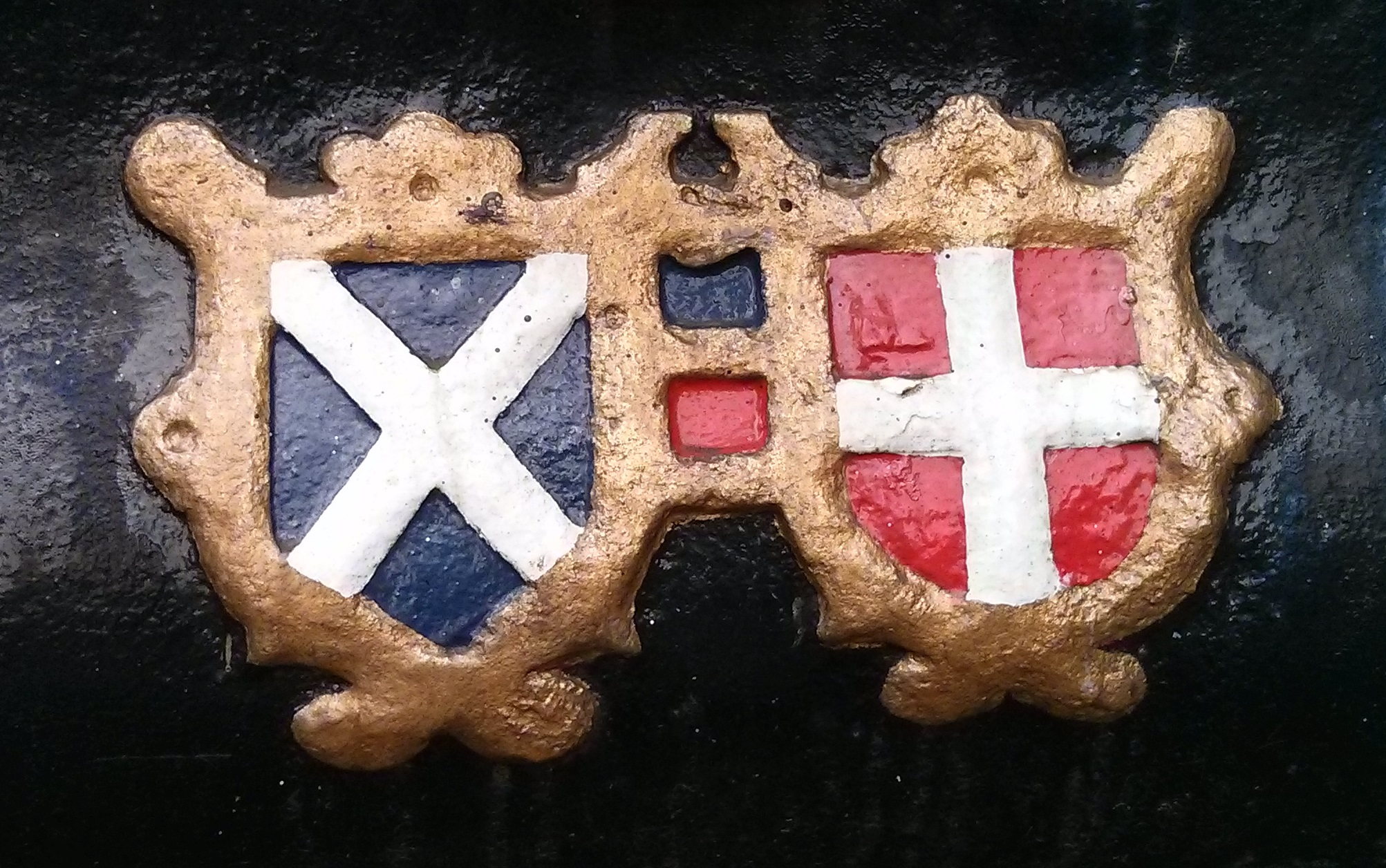
- Coats of arms of St Andrew and St George

St Andrew Holborn Above the Bars with St George the Martyr (also known as St Andrew Holborn Above the Bars with St George the Martyr Queen Square) was a civil parish in the metropolitan area of London, that existed from 1767 to 1930. The four Inns of Court are all within the parish.

== History ==
The ancient parish of St Andrew Holborn was partly within the City of London and partly in the county of Middlesex.

When the Queen Square area, in the Middlesex section of the parish, was developed, a new chapel dedicated to St George was constructed between 1705 and 1706. In 1723 this area became the parish of St George the Martyr.

This was recombined with the remaining Middlesex portion of St Andrew Holborn in 1767 to create St Andrew Holborn Above the Bars with St George the Martyr.

== Governance ==
The parish became part of the district of the Metropolitan Board of Works in 1855 and was grouped into the Holborn District. The board district became the County of London in 1889 and the parish became part of the Metropolitan Borough of Holborn in 1900. On 31 March 1930 the parish was abolished to form with Holborn. At the 1921 census (the last before the abolition of the parish), St Andrew Holborn Above the Bars with St George the Martyr had a population of 19,224.
