= 1949 Bermondsey Borough Council election =

Local election in England

Elections to the Metropolitan Borough of Bermondsey were held in 1949.

The borough had 12 wards which returned between 3 and 6 members. Of the 12 wards 3 of the wards had all candidates elected unopposed. Labour won all the seats, the Conservatives only stood in 5 wards, the Liberal Party in 3 wards and the Communist Party in 1 ward.

== Election result ==
Bermondsey Borough Election Result 1949
Party	Seats	Gains	Losses	Net gain/loss	Seats %	Votes %	Votes	+/−
Labour	54				100.0			
Conservative	0				0.0			
Liberal	0				0.0			
Communist	0				0.0			

Preceded by 1945 Bermondsey Borough election	Southwark local elections	Succeeded by 1953 Bermondsey Borough election
