= 1937 Bermondsey Borough Council election =

Local election in England

Elections to the Metropolitan Borough of Bermondsey were held in 1937.

The borough had 12 wards which returned between 3 and 6 members. Of the 12 wards 2 of the wards had all candidates elected unopposed. Labour won all of the seats.

== Electoral arrangements ==
Councillors were elected for a three-year term, to go out of office in November 1940. However, due to the Second World War, and the provisions of the Local Elections and Register of Electors (Temporary Provisions) Acts 1939–1944 and the Representation of the People Act 1945, the terms of those elected in 1937 were extended to 1945.

== Election result ==
Bermondsey Borough Election Result 1937
Party	Seats	Gains	Losses	Net gain/loss	Seats %	Votes %	Votes	+/−
Labour	54				100.0			–
Conservative	0				0.0			
Independent Labour Conservative	0				0.0			
Aged and Infirm Person's Society	0				0.0			

Preceded by 1934 Bermondsey Borough election	Southwark local elections	Succeeded by 1945 Bermondsey Borough election
