= Holborn Town Hall =

Municipal building in London, England

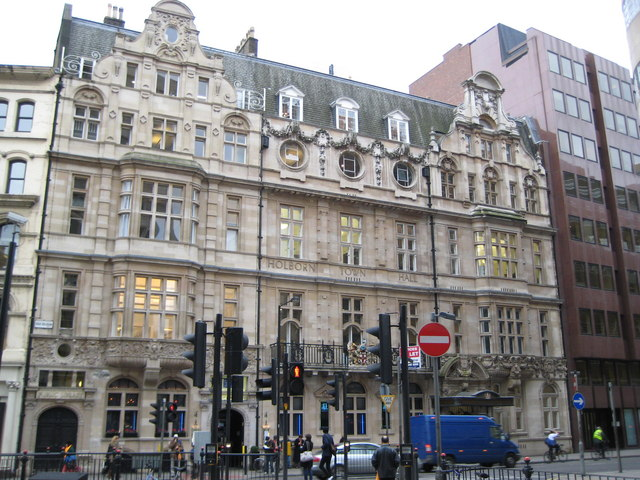
- Holborn Town Hall (the wing on the left was the old public library; the central wing and the wing on the right were added later)

- Shown in Camden
- 51.5169°N 0.1227°W
- Location: Holborn

History
- Built: 1894

Site notes
- Architect(s): William Rushworth (1894 building); Septimus Warwick and H Austen Hall (1908 extension)
- Architectural style: French Renaissance style

Listed Building – Grade II
- Designated: 15 January 1973
- Reference no.: 1378893

Holborn Town hall is a municipal building on High Holborn, Holborn, London. It is a Grade II listed building.

== History ==
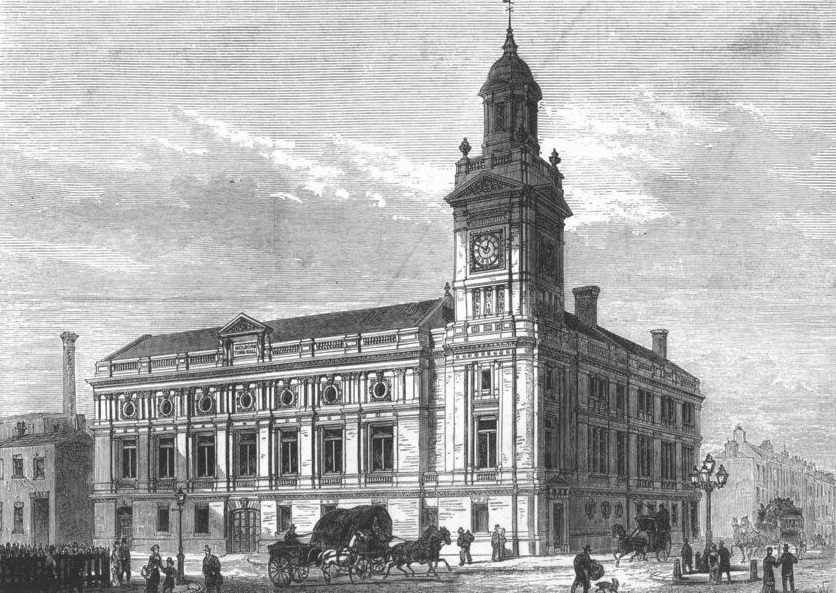
Old Holborn Town Hall on Gray's Inn Road

The first town hall was a substantial structure on the corner of Gray's Inn Road and Clerkenwell Road which was commissioned by the Holborn District Board of Works on behalf of the Vestry of St Andrew Holborn Above Bars. It had been designed by Lewis Isaacs in an Italianate style, built by Brown & Robinson of Finsbury and completed in 1879. Following the creation of the Metropolitan Borough of Holborn in 1900, consideration was given to expanding this building but this proposal was rejected on the grounds that the old building would be difficult to adapt. After being used as a concert hall during the first half of the 20th century, it was demolished in the 1960s.

Instead it was decided to extend an existing building on High Holborn which had been designed by William Rushworth in the French Renaissance style and which had opened as a public library in 1894. The design for the existing (eastern) wing had involved a narrow main frontage with four bays facing onto High Holborn; there were two arched entrances both flanked by Corinthian order pilasters on the ground floor; there were oriel windows on the first and second floors and smaller windows on the third and fourth floors with an oculus above.

The foundation stone for the extension to this building to create a new town hall was laid by the mayor, William Smith, on 27 October 1906. The design involved creating a new central wing and a new western wing, in a similar and symmetrical style to the existing eastern wing, based on the plans of Septimus Warwick and H. Austen Hall. The works were carried out by John Greenwood Limited and the new town hall was officially opened by the Lord Mayor, Sir George Truscott, on 13 October 1908. A wrought-iron balcony bearing a borough coat of arms made by the Bromsgrove Guild of Applied Arts was installed in the middle of the central section on the first floor. The principal rooms were a court room on the ground floor a council chamber at the rear of the building on the first floor.

The First International Syndicalist Congress, a meeting of European and Latin American syndicalist organizations, was held at the town hall from 27 September to 2 October 1913.

A plaque, manufactured by De La Rue, commemorating the efforts of the borough in contributing to the Wings for Victory Week, was erected on the wall just inside the right hand doorway in 1943. Another plaque, commemorating their contribution to Salute the Soldier Week, was erected there the following year.

The building on High Holborn ceased to function as the local of seat of government when the enlarged London Borough of Camden was formed in 1965 and was subsequently converted for alternative uses including restaurant use (on the ground floor) and offices (above). The freehold ownership of the building was acquired by a private investor for £22 million in September 2019.
