= St Giles District (Metropolis) =

St Giles District St Giles in the Fields and St George Bloomsbury
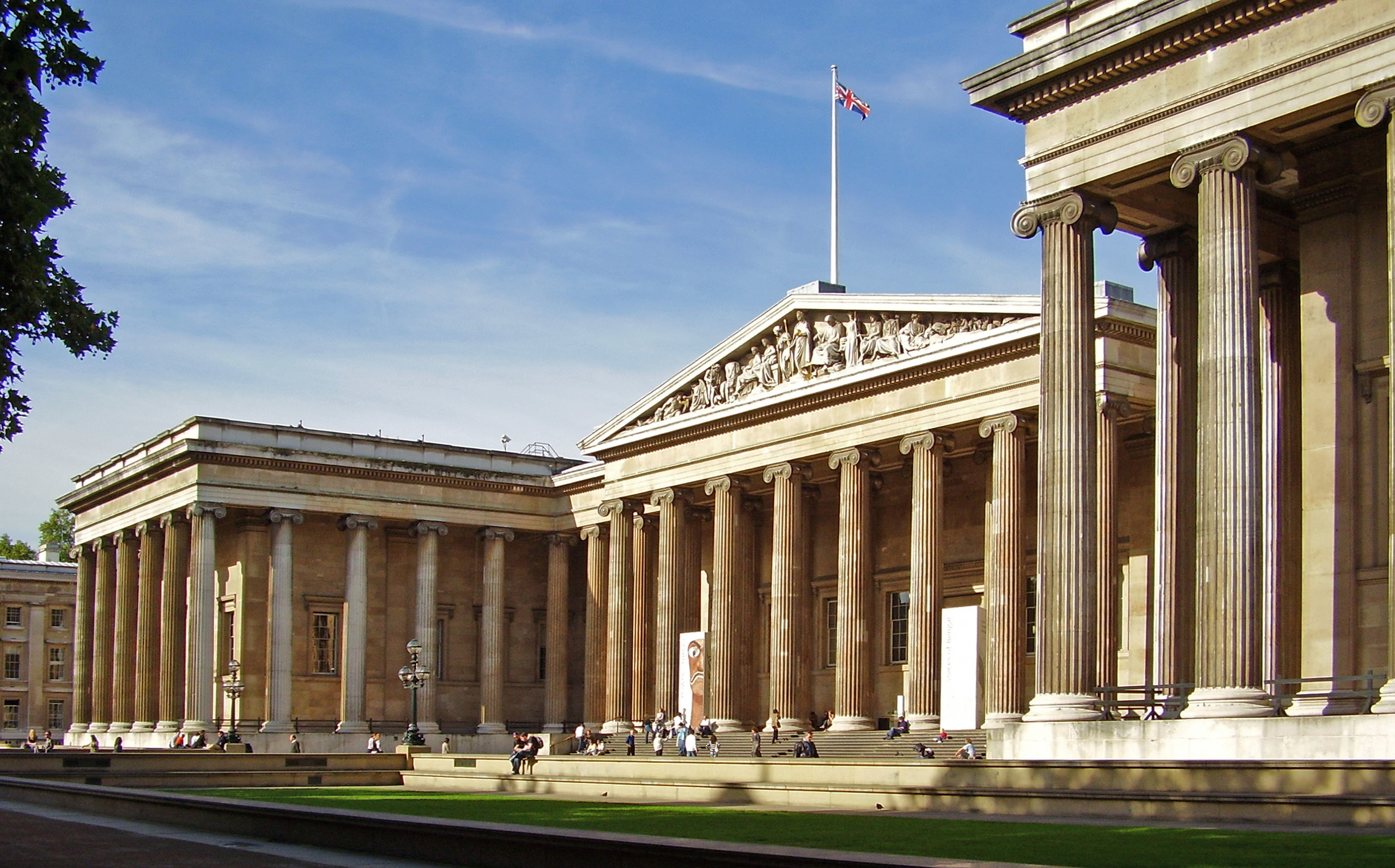

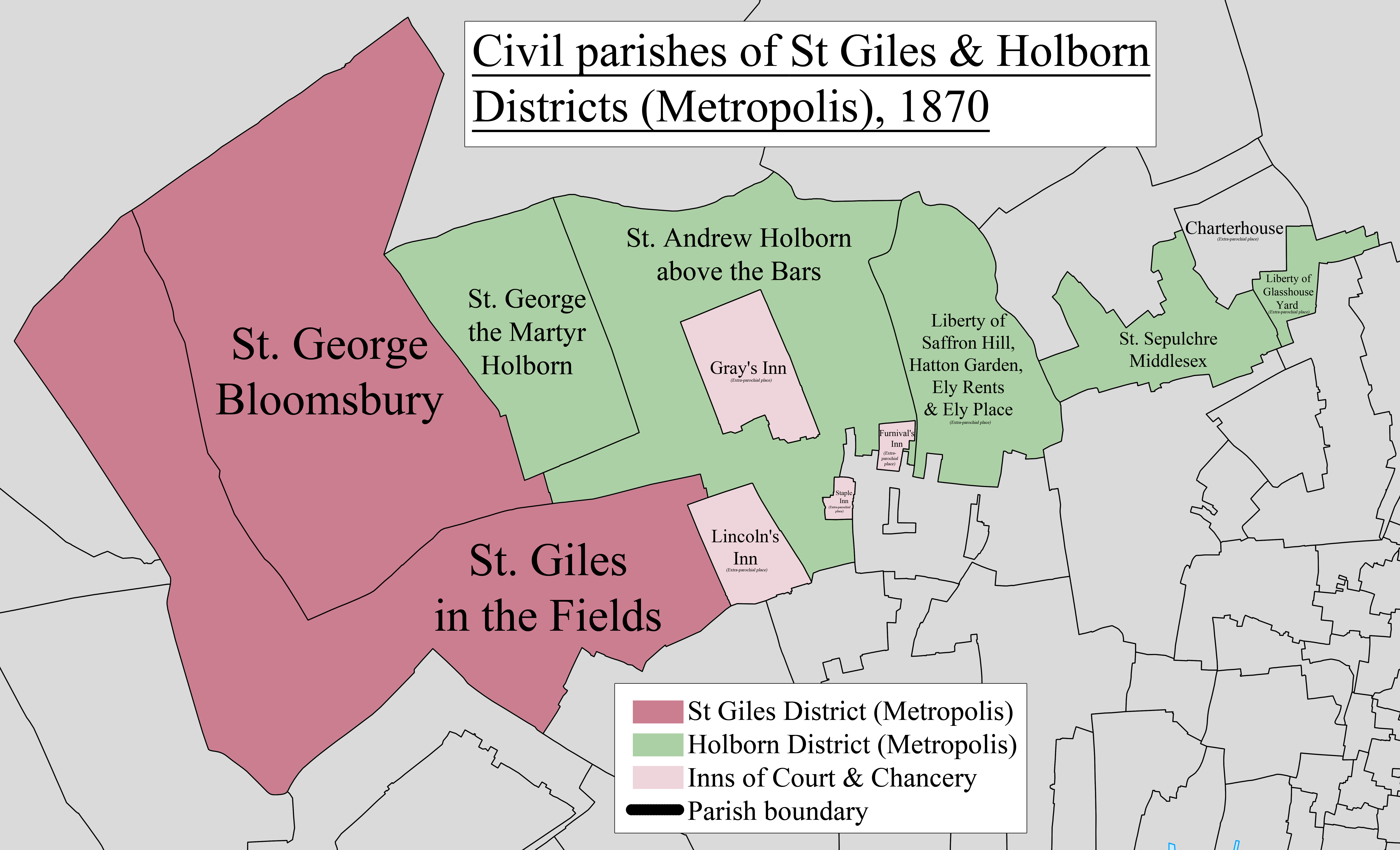
- Area
  - 1861: 245 acres (0.99 km^{2})
  - 1881: 245 acres (0.99 km^{2})
  - 1891: 244 acres (0.99 km^{2})
- Population
  - 1861: 54,076
  - 1881: 45,382
  - 1891: 39,782
- History
  - Origin: Combination of St George Bloomsbury with St Giles in the Fields
  - Created: 1774
  - Abolished: 1930
  - Succeeded by: Metropolitan Borough of Holborn
- Status: Civil parish (1774 – 1930); District (1855 – 1900)
- Government: St Giles District Board of Works
  - HQ: High Holborn

St Giles District was a local government district in the metropolitan area of London, England from 1855 to 1900. The district was created by the Metropolis Management Act 1855, and comprised the civil parish of St Giles in the Fields and St George Bloomsbury, Middlesex: the two parishes had been combined for civil purposes in 1774. The district was abolished in 1900 and its former area became part of the Metropolitan Borough of Holborn. On 31 March 1930 the parish was abolished to form Holborn. At the 1921 census (the last before the abolition of the parish), St Giles in the Fields and St George Bloomsbury had a population of 22,830. It is now part of the London Borough of Camden.

== Geography ==
The boundaries of the district took in the whole of Lincoln's Inn Fields to the southeast and the western section of High Holborn. The southern boundary ran along Drury Lane and fell a few yards short of Shelton Street, taking in the district of Seven Dials. In the west the boundary ran a few yards to the west of Charing Cross Road and Tottenham Court Road. To the north the district took in Bloomsbury, including Russell Square. The northern boundary was roughly aligned to Torrington Place, Gordon Square, Tavistock Square and Tavistock Place. Much of the eastern boundary was aligned to Southampton Row, with a small section north of Bernard Street, reaching as far as Hunter Street.

== District board ==
The district was governed by the St Giles District Board of Works, which consisted of forty-eight elected vestrymen: twenty-seven elected for the parish of St Giles, and 21 for that of St George. The first elections were held in November 1855 when the entire membership of the board was elected. Thereafter elections for one third of the seats were held in May, beginning in the year 1857.

St Giles District was originally in the area of responsibility of the Metropolitan Board of Works, to which body it nominated one member. In 1889 the area of the MBW was constituted the County of London, and the district board became a local authority under the London County Council.

== Abolition ==
The district was abolished in 1900 by the London Government Act 1899, which divided the County of London into twenty-eight metropolitan boroughs. The area administered by the board became part of the Metropolitan Borough of Holborn.
