= Metropolitan Borough of Holborn =

Metropolitan borough in London

Coordinates: 51.5171°N 0.1228°W

Holborn
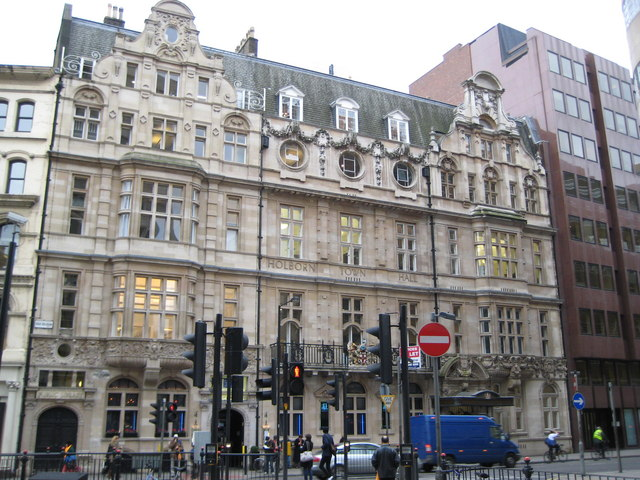
- Holborn Town Hall

- Holborn within the County of London
- Area
  - 1911: 405 acres (1.64 km^{2})
  - 1931: 406 acres (1.64 km^{2})
  - 1961: 407 acres (1.65 km^{2})
- Population
  - 1911: 49,357
  - 1931: 38,860
  - 1961: 22,008
- Density
  - 1911: 121/acre
  - 1931: 96/acre
  - 1961: 54/acre
- History
  - Created: 1900
  - Abolished: 1965
  - Succeeded by: London Borough of Camden
- Status: Metropolitan borough
- Government: Holborn Borough Council
  - HQ: High Holborn
  - Motto: Multi Pertransibunt et Augebitur Scientia (Many shall pass through and learning shall be increased)
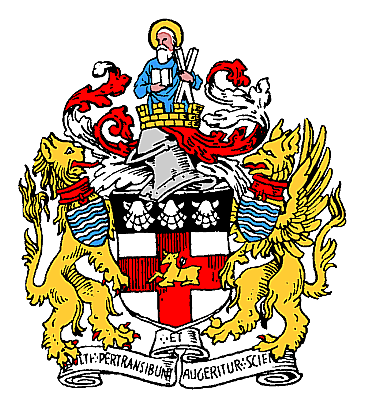
- Coat of arms of the borough council
- Map of borough boundary

The Metropolitan Borough of Holborn was a metropolitan borough in the County of London between 1900 and 1965. The borough included most of Holborn (the parts outside the City of London) as well as Bloomsbury and St Giles.

In 1965 the borough amalgamated with the Metropolitan Borough of St Pancras and the Metropolitan Borough of Hampstead to form the new London Borough of Camden.

== Formation and boundaries ==
The borough was formed in 1900 from seven civil parishes and extra-parochial places:

- St Giles in the Fields and St George Bloomsbury
- St Andrew Holborn Above the Bars with St George the Martyr
- Liberty of Saffron Hill
- Furnival's Inn (part outside the City of London)
- Gray's Inn
- Lincoln's Inn
- Staple Inn

In 1930 these seven were combined into a single civil parish called Holborn, which was conterminous with the metropolitan borough.

Previous to the borough's formation it had been administered by two separate local bodies: Holborn District Board of Works and St Giles District Board of Works. The Inns of Court and Inns of Chancery had not been under the control of any local authority prior to 1900.

== Coat of arms ==
St Giles, St George (patron saint of Bloomsbury) and St Andrew (patron saint of Holborn) were depicted on the borough seal. The several constituent parishes were illustrated in the arms granted to Holborn in 1906, while the supporters, the Lion and the Griffin are from the arms of Lincoln's Inn and Gray's Inn (Inns of Court).

Charges from these arms were used, together with charges from the coats of arms of Hampstead and of St. Pancras, when the new coat of arms of the London Borough of Camden was designed in 1965.

== Visible legacy ==
Several of the street name signs in the British Museum/Senate House area still bear the "Borough of Holborn" area designation. Holborn Town Hall, built in 1894, still exists, on High Holborn, and still has the coat of arms in the façade. The entrance gate piers to the church of St Giles-in-the-Fields commemorate the Borough when it was amalgamated in 1965, and bear an inscription to this effect, although the arch that bore the borough's arms has since been removed.

== Population and area ==
Holborn was the smallest of the twenty-eight metropolitan boroughs of the County of London, with an area of between 405 and 407 acres (1.6 km^{2}). Therefore, it was even smaller than the City of London. It also had the smallest population of any of the boroughs throughout its existence. The populations recorded in National Censuses were:

Constituent parishes 1801–1899

Year	1801	1811	1821	1831	1841	1851	1861	1871	1881	1891
Population	67,103	80,642	88,172	90,670	93,767	95,726	94,074	93,513	78,668	70,938

Metropolitan Borough 1900-1961

Year	1901	1911	1921	1931	1941	1951	1961
Population	59,405	49,357	43,192	38,860		24,810	22,008

== Politics ==
A map showing the wards of Holborn Metropolitan Borough as they appeared in 1952.

The borough was divided into nine wards for elections: Central St Giles, Lincoln's Inn, North Bloomsbury, North St Andrew, North St Giles, Saffron Hill, South Bloomsbury, South East St Andrew and St George the Martyr.

=== Parliament constituency ===
For elections to Parliament, the borough was represented by one constituency:

- Holborn

In 1950 the borough's representation was reduced to half a seat, when it was merged with part of St Pancras:

- Holborn and St Pancras South

== Gallery ==
Borough seal

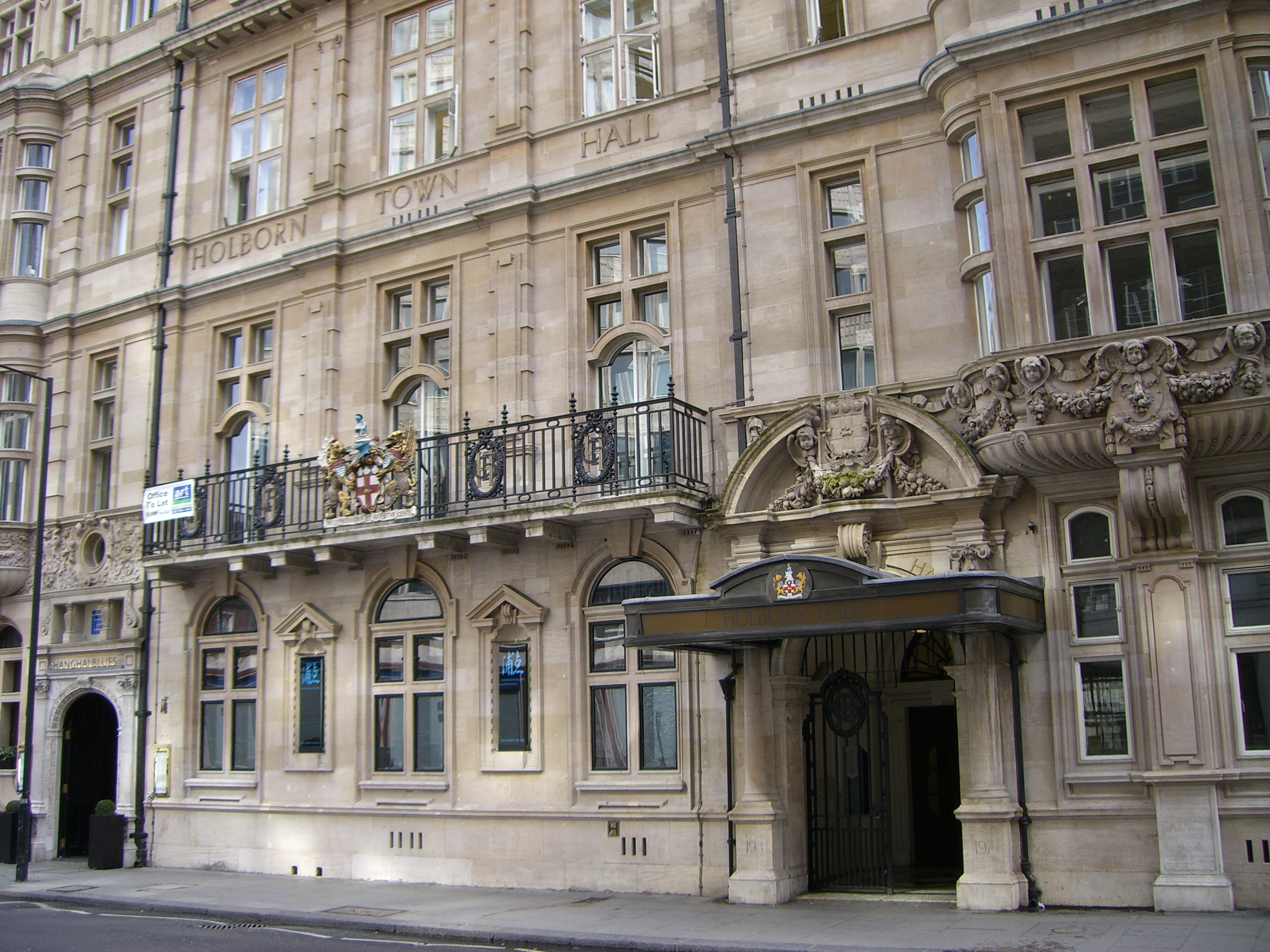
Town Hall frontage

== See also ==
- London Government Act 1899
- Metropolis Management Act 1855
- Bourne Estate
