= 1931 London local elections =

Local elections in England

- 2 November 1931

All 1,385 councillors in all 28 metropolitan boroughs
	First party	Second party
Party	Municipal Reform	Labour
Councils	24	3
Councils +/–	▲5	▼5
Councillors	1,124	257

Local elections were held in London on 2 November 1931.

== Electoral arrangements ==
The County of London, outside of the City of London, was divided into 28 metropolitan boroughs. Each borough was divided into a number of multi-member electoral wards.

Councillors were elected to serve a three-year term, to go out of office in 1934.

Ward boundaries were changed in Lambeth (45 councillors increased to 60). Total councillors were increased by 15 from 1,370 to 1,385.

== Results ==
The results for each borough were as follows:

Borough	Previous control	New control	Municipal Reform (Note: Includes all Conservative Party-aligned candidates who stood as Municipal Reform or another name.)	Labour	Independent	Total	Details
Battersea	Labour	Municipal Reform	31	23		54	
Bermondsey	Labour	Labour	9	45		54	Details
Bethnal Green	Municipal Reform	Municipal Reform	30			30	
Camberwell	Municipal Reform	Municipal Reform	46	14		60	
Chelsea	Municipal Reform	Municipal Reform	36			36	
Deptford	Labour	Labour	15	21		36	
Finsbury	Labour	Municipal Reform	47	9		56	
Fulham	Municipal Reform	Municipal Reform	40			40	
Greenwich	No overall control	No overall control	15	15		30	
Hackney	Municipal Reform	Municipal Reform	59	1		60	
Hammersmith	Municipal Reform	Municipal Reform	33	3		36	
Hampstead	Municipal Reform	Municipal Reform	42			42	
Holborn	Municipal Reform	Municipal Reform	41	1		42	
Islington	Municipal Reform	Municipal Reform	60			60	
Kensington	Municipal Reform	Municipal Reform	54	6		60	
Lambeth	Municipal Reform	Municipal Reform	60			60	
Lewisham	Municipal Reform	Municipal Reform	45	5		50	
Paddington	Municipal Reform	Municipal Reform	60			60	
Poplar	Labour	Labour	5	36	1	42	
Shoreditch	Labour	Municipal Reform	36	6		42	
Southwark	Municipal Reform	Municipal Reform	51	7	2	60	Details
Stepney	Labour	Municipal Reform	33	26	1	60	
St Marylebone	Municipal Reform	Municipal Reform	55	5		60	
Stoke Newington	Municipal Reform	Municipal Reform	30			30	
St Pancras	Municipal Reform	Municipal Reform	48	12		60	
Wandsworth	Municipal Reform	Municipal Reform	60			60	
Westminster	Municipal Reform	Municipal Reform	60			60	
Woolwich	Labour	Municipal Reform	23	22		45	
Total			1,124	257	4	1,385	
