= 1934 London local elections =

Local elections in England

- 1 November 1934

All 1,386 councillors in all 28 metropolitan boroughs
	First party	Second party
Party	Labour	Municipal Reform
Councils	15	13
Councils +/–	▲10	▼9
Councillors	717	619

Local elections were held in London on 1 November 1934.

== Electoral arrangements ==
The County of London, outside of the City of London, was divided into 28 metropolitan boroughs. Each borough was divided into a number of multi-member electoral wards.

Councillors were elected to serve a three-year term, to go out of office in 1937.

Ward boundaries were changed in Battersea (54 councillors increased to 55) and Greenwich. Total councillors were increased by 1 from 1,385 to 1,386.

== Results ==
The results for each borough were as follows:

Borough	Previous control	New control	Labour	Municipal Reform (Note: Includes all Conservative Party-aligned candidates who stood as Municipal Reform or another name.)	Total	Details
Battersea	Municipal Reform	Labour	37	18	55	
Bermondsey	Labour	Labour	54		54	Details
Bethnal Green	Municipal Reform	Labour	30		30	
Camberwell	Municipal Reform	Labour	36	24	60	
Chelsea	Municipal Reform	Municipal Reform		36	36	
Deptford	Labour	Labour	30	6	36	
Finsbury	Municipal Reform	Labour	47	9	56	
Fulham	Municipal Reform	Labour	27	13	40	
Greenwich	No overall control	Labour	21	9	30	
Hackney	Labour	Labour	45	15	60	
Hammersmith	Municipal Reform	Municipal Reform	16	20	36	
Hampstead	Municipal Reform	Municipal Reform		42	42	
Holborn	Municipal Reform	Municipal Reform		42	42	
Islington	Municipal Reform	Labour	34	26	60	
Kensington	Municipal Reform	Municipal Reform	14	46	60	
Lambeth	Municipal Reform	Municipal Reform	29	31	60	
Lewisham	Municipal Reform	Municipal Reform	5	45	50	
Paddington	Municipal Reform	Municipal Reform	21	39	60	
Poplar	Labour	Labour	42		42	
Shoreditch	Municipal Reform	Labour	36	6	42	
Southwark	Municipal Reform	Labour	59	1	60	Details
Stepney	Municipal Reform	Labour	60		60	
St Marylebone	Municipal Reform	Municipal Reform	9	51	60	
Stoke Newington	Municipal Reform	Municipal Reform	7	23	30	
St Pancras	Municipal Reform	Municipal Reform	28	32	60	
Wandsworth	Municipal Reform	Municipal Reform	7	53	60	
Westminster	Municipal Reform	Municipal Reform		60	60	
Woolwich	Municipal Reform	Labour	35	10	45	
Total			717	669	1,386	
