= London Government Act 1939 =

Act of the Parliament of the United Kingdom

London Government Act 1939 (Note: Section 208.)
- Act of Parliament
- Parliament of the United Kingdom
- Long title: An Act to consolidate with amendments certain enactments relating to local government in London.
- Citation: 2 & 3 Geo. 6. c. 40
- Introduced by: William Hare, 5th Earl of Listowel (Lords)
- Territorial extent: United Kingdom

Dates
- Royal assent: 13 July 1939
- Commencement: 1 January 1940 (Note: Section 208.)
- Repealed: 1 April 1965
Other legislation
Repeals/revokes	See § Repealed enactments
Amended by	Town and Country Planning Act 1947; Local Government Act 1948; National Assistance Act 1948; Representation of the People Act 1948; Representation of the People Act 1949; Housing (Financial Provisions) Act 1958; Mental Health Act 1959; Charities Act 1960
Repealed by	London Government Act 1963

Status: Repealed

History of passage through Parliament

Records of Parliamentary debate relating to the statute from Hansard

Text of statute as originally enacted

The London Government Act 1939 (2 & 3 Geo. 6. c. 40) was an act of the Parliament of the United Kingdom that consolidated existing law relating to the administration of London.

== Background ==
Existing law on local government in London had grown considerably, leading to the desire to incorporate the whole of the existing law on local government in the London area.

The act consolidated 105 statutes, repealing 15 in their entirety and 90 in part.

== Passage ==
The London Government Bill had its first reading in the House of Lords on 7 February 1939, introduced by William Hare, 5th Earl of Listowel and its second reading in the House of Lords on 28 February 1939. The bill was supported by Sir Herbert Jessel, 1st Baron Jessel, who argued for protections for the names of the City of Westminster and the Royal Borough of Kensington and Chelsea.

The bill was committed to a joint committee of both Houses of Parliament on 28 February 1939, who took evidence, including from local authorities, and issued a report on 9 May 1939.

The bill had its third reading in the House of Lords on 27 June 1939, first reading in the House of Commons on 28 June 1939, second reading in the House of Commons on 6 July 1939, and third reading in the House of Commons on 8 July 1939.

The bill received royal assent on 13 July 1939.

== Provisions ==
=== County council ===
Section 1 of the act designated London as an administrative county named The Administrative County of London", consisting of:

- The City of London
- Metropolitan boroughs: Battersea, Bermondsey, Bethnal Green, Camberwell, Deptford, Finsbury, Fulham, Greenwich, Hackney, Hammersmith, Hampstead, Holborn, Islington, Kensington, Lambeth, Lewisham, Paddington, Poplar, St. Marylebone, St Pancras, Shoreditch, Southwark, Stepney, Stoke Newington, Wandsworth, Westminster and Woolwich
- The Inner Temple and the Middle Temple

Section 2 of the act established the county council, consisting of the chairman, county aldermen and county councillors, as a body corporate named The London County Council.

Sections 3–4 of the act provided that the chairman of the county council be elected annually from among the county aldermen and county councillors as the first business at the annual meeting of the county council.

Sections 5–6 of the act provided for the appointment of the vice-chairman and deputy chairman of the council.

Sections 7–8 of the act provided that county aldermen, who must number one sixth of the number of county councillors, be elected by the county council every third year from among the county councillors at the annual meeting of the council, immediately after the election of the chairman.

Sections 9–16 of the act provided that county councillors serve for three years, with elections to be held between 1–8 March, dividing the county council into electoral divisions mapped to the existing parliamentary constituency boundaries, each with double the number of county councillors as it has Members of Parliament and separate elections of councillors.

=== Metropolitan borough councils ===
Section 17 of the act constituted a metropolitan borough council for each metropolitan borough, consisting of the mayor, aldermen and councillors, as a body corporate by the name:

- For the City of Westminster, "The Mayor, Aldermen and Councillors of the City of Westminster"
- For the Royal Borough of Kensington and Chelsea, "The Mayor, Aldermen and Councillors of the Royal Borough of Kensington and Chelsea"
- For other boroughs, "The Mayor, Aldermen and Councillors of ____"

Sections 18–19 of the act provided that the mayor of the borough council be elected annually from among the county aldermen and county councillors as the first business at the annual meeting of the council.

Section 20 of the act provided for the appointment of the deputy mayor of the borough council.

Sections 21–22 of the act provided that borough aldermen, who must number one sixth of the number of borough councillors, be elected by the county council every third year from among the borough councillors at the annual meeting of the council, immediately after the election of the mayor.

Sections 23–30 of the act provided that borough councillors serve for three years, with elections to be held on 1 November, dividing the borough council into wards with boundaries, number of councillors and apportionment of councillors fixed by the Secretary of State.

=== General provisions ===
Section 31 of the act provided qualifications for being elected and holding office, permitting local government electors for the area, freehold or leasehold owners within the area or those residing in the area for 12 months preceding the election to vote.

Section 32 of the act provided that there is no term limit for office and outgoing officers may be re-elected.

Section 33–35 of the act disqualified certain individuals for being elected and, including the bankrupt, those receiving poor relief, and coroners.

=== Committees ===
Section 59 of the act granted local authorities the power to appoint committees for any purpose.

Section 60 of the act required the county council and the borough councils to appoint a finance committee.

Section 62 of the act required the council to appoint a mental hospitals committee for the purposes of the Lunacy and Mental Deficiency Treatment Acts 1890 to 1930 and the Mental Deficiency Acts 1913 to 1927.

=== Officers ===
Sections 70–75 of the act required the county council to appoint a clerk of the county council, a county treasurer, a county medical officer and a county surveyor, of suitable qualification and any other officers deemed necessary.

Sections 76–81 of the act required borough councils to appoint a town clerk, a borough treasurer, a borough surveyor, a borough medical officer and sanitary inspectors, of suitable qualification.

Sections 82–83 of the act allowed local authorities to appoint standing and temporary deputies, subject to some qualifications for medical and sanitary officers, of suitable qualification.

=== Land ===
Sections 97–105 of the act granted local authorities the power to acquire land by agreement or compulsorily, subject to notice and compensation.

Section 106 of the act granted local authorities the power to appropriate land.

Section 107–109 of the act granted local authorities the power to let, sell or exchange land.

=== Expenses ===
Section 116 of the act required the county council to prepare an annual budget.

Section 117 of the act granted the county council the power to issue precepts (council tax) to cover their liabilities.

Section 120 of the act granted borough councils the power to levy rates (tax) to cover their liabilities.

=== Borrowing ===
Section 124–145 of the act granted borough councils the power to borrow money to acquire land, erect buildings, conduct work or other authorised purposes.

=== Byelaws ===
Section 146–149 of the act granted local authorities the powers to make byelaws for good rule and government and suppression of nuisances with fines imposed against offenders.

=== Promotion of and opposition to bills in Parliament ===
Section 150 of the act granted the county council the power to promote a bill in Parliament for the improvement of the county, public benefit of inhabitants and the provision of parks, pleasure grounds, places of recreation and open spaces.

Section 151–152 of the act granted local authorities the power to promote or oppose bills in Parliament, for borough councils subject to the approval of local government electors.

=== Other provisions ===
Section 155 of the act allowed local authorities to provide and furnish halls, offices and other buildings for business purposes and public meetings and assemblies.

Section 156 of the act granted the county council the power to acquire buildings or places of historical or architectural interest.

Section 157 of the act granted the county council the power to acquire buildings for works of art, exhibitions, museums and antiquities.

Section 158 of the act granted borough councils the power to provide public clocks on any building in the borough.

Section 159 of the act allowed borough councils to admit honorary freemen on a list called the "freemen's roll".

Section 160 of the act granted local authorities the ability to enter into contracts to discharge their functions.

Section 161 of the act allowed local authorities to organise conferences of local authorities.

Section 161 of the act allowed the county council to make contributions to the funds or expenses of associations.

Section 171 of the act transferred all public books, writings and papers of parishes (with the exception of registers of baptisms, marriages and burials and other church-related documents) to the borough councils.

Section 175 of the act required borough councils to produce an annual report of its proceedings, including income and expenditure.

Section 176–178 of the act granted local authorities the power to prosecute, defend or appear at legal proceedings.

Section 189 of the act granted government departments the power to direct inquiries.

Section 190–196 of the act allowed the county council to give publicity to the amenities and advantages of the county, make expenses in connection with ceremonies or official visits, spend money on investigations, contribute to funds of hospitals, establish a fire insurance fund, purchase and store and supply goods to other authorities.

=== Repealed enactments ===
Section 207 of the act repealed 105 enactments, listed in the eighth schedule to the act, repealing 15 in their entirety and 90 in part.

Enactments ceasing to have effect
Citation	Short title	Extent of repeal
9 Ann. c. 25	Municipal Offices Act 1710	The whole act, except so far as it relates to the City of London.
57 Geo. 3. c. xxix	Metropolitan Paving Act 1817	Sections 51 and 96.
7 Geo. 4. c. 63	County Buildings Act 1826	The whole act, except so far as it relates to assize courts, sessions houses and judges lodges.
13 & 14 Vict. c. 101	Poor Law Amendment Act 1850	Section 6.
18 & 19 Vict. c. 120	Metropolis Management Act 1855	Sections 57, 66, 139, 191, 202 and 235.
24 & 25 Vict. c. 125	Parochial Offices Act 1861	Section 1.
25 & 26 Vict. c. 102	Metropolis Management Amendment Act 1862	Sections 5–8, 13, 20, 23.
35 & 36 Vict. c. 91	Borough Funds Act 1872	Section 10.
36 & 37 Vict. c. 19	Poor Allotments Management Act 1873	Section 15.
39 & 40 Vict. c. 61	Divided Parishes and Poor Law Amendment Act 1876	Sections 1–9.
39 & 40 Vict. c. 42	Sale of Exhausted Parish Lands Act 1876	The whole act, except so far as it relates to the City of London.
42 & 43 Vict. c. 54	Poor Law Act 1879	Sections 4–7.
51 & 52 Vict. c. 41	Local Government Act 1888	Sections 4, 19, 54, 56 and 75 proviso (18) so far as it provides that the costs of election are not to exceed those allowed by Part I of the First Schedule to the Parliamentary Elections (Returning Officers) Act 1875, as amended by the Parliamentary Elections (Returning Officers) Act 1885 and proviso (19).
53 & 54 Vict. c. 5	Lunacy Act 1890	Sections 174, except so far as it relates to the City of London and 256, except so far as it relates to the City of London.
62 & 63 Vict. c. 14	London Government Act 1899	Sections 8 and 9.
17 & 18 Geo. 5. c. 14	Poor Law Act 1927	Section 8, subsection (2).
2 Geo. 5. & 1 Edw. 8. c. 50	Public Health (London) Act 1936	Section 57, so much of subsection (2) as requires the recommendation of a committee to the institution of legal proceedings.

Enactments repealed
Citation	Short title	Extent of repeal
22 Hen. 8. c. 5	Bridges Act 1530	Sections 3 (partial) and 6.
9 Anne c. 25	Municipal Offices Act 1710	The whole act, except so far as it relates to the City of London.
12 Geo. 2. c. 29	County Rates Act 1738	Sections 6 (partial), 7–9, 11 and 14 (partial).
43 Geo. 3. c. 59	Bridges Act 1803	Section 1 (partial).
55 Geo. 3. c. 51	County Rates Act 1815	Section 17.
55 Geo. 3. c. 143	Bridges Act 1815	Sections 1 (partial) and 5 (partial).
57 Geo. 3. c. xxix	Metropolitan Paving Act 1817	Sections 45–51, 96 (partial), 97–108, 109 (partial), 110, 120, 124 and 129 (partial).
58 Geo. 3. c. 69	Vestries Act 1818	Section 6.
59 Geo. 3. c. 12	Poor Relief Act 1819	Section 17.
7 Geo. 4. c. 63	County Buildings Act 1826	The whole act, except so far as relates to assize courts, sessions houses and judges' lodgings.
7 Will 4. & 1 Vict. c. 24	County Buildings Act 1837	The whole act, except so far as relates to assize courts, sessions houses and judges' lodgings.
7 Will 4. & 1 Vict. c. 83	Parliamentary Documents Deposit Act 1839	The whole act.
2 & 3 Vict. c. 84	Poor Rate Act 1839	Section 3.
4 & 5 Vict. c. 38	School Sites Act 1841	Section 6 (partial).
7 & 8 Vict. c. 101	Poor Law Amendment Act 1844	Section 61.
10 & 11 Vict. c. 28	County Buildings Act 1847	The whole act, except so far as relates to assize courts, sessions houses and judges' lodgings.
13 & 14 Vict. c. 101	Poor Law Amendment Act 1850	Section 6.
15 & 16 Vict. c. 85	Burial Act 1852	Sections 13–15, 16 (partial), 17, 19, 20, 24, 26 (partial), 28 and 31 (partial).
18 & 19 Vict. c. 120	Metropolis Management Act 1855	Sections 8–10, 28, 30, 57, 60–66, 92, 139, 140 (partial), 149, 151, 156, 183, 185–191, 201 (partial), 206 (partial), 207 (partial), 220, 222 (partial), 223 and 235. Schedules E and F.
19 & 20 Vict. c. 112	Metropolis Management Amendment Act 1856	Sections 9 and 10.
20 & 21 Vict. c. 81	Burial Act 1857	Sections 19–21.
24 & 25 Vict. c. 125	Parochial Offices Act 1861	The whole act.
25 & 26 Vict. c. 102	Metropolis Management Amendment Act 1862	Sections 5–8, 13, 19, 20, 23, 37, 39, 72 (partial), 90 (partial) and 114. Schedule C.
26 & 27 Vict. c. 13	Town Gardens Protection Act 1863	Section 63.
29 & 30 Vict. c. 122	Metropolitan Commons Act 1866	Section 26.
33 & 34 Vict. c. 23	Forfeiture Act 1870	Section 2, so far as relates to membership of a local authority.
35 & 36 Vict. c. 91	Borough Funds Act 1872	The whole act.
36 & 37 Vict. c. 19	Poor Allotments Management Act 1873	Section 15.
38 & 39 Vict. c. 17	Explosives Act 1875	Section 72 (partial).
39 & 40 Vict. c. 61	Divided Parishes and Poor Law Amendment Act 1876	Sections 1–9.
39 & 40 Vict. c. 62	Sale of Exhausted Parish Lands Act 1876	The whole act, except so far as it relates to the City of London.
39 & 40 Vict. c. 75	Rivers Pollution Prevention Act 1876	Section 14 (partial) and 15.
42 & 43 Vict. c. 56	Electric Lighting Act 1882	Section 8 (partial). Entries in the 4th, 5th, 6th and 7th columns in the Schedule.
46 & 47 Vict. c. 52	Bankruptcy Act 1883	Sections, 32, subsection (1), paragraph (d), except so far as relates to the City of London and paragraph (e). Section 34, except so far as relates to the City of London.
48 & 49 Vict. c. 10	Elections (Hours of Poll) Act 1885	The whole act, except so far as it relates to parliamentary elections.
48 & 49 Vict. c. 33	Metropolis Management Amendment Act 1885	Sections 7 and 8.
51 & 52 Vict. c. 41	Local Government Act 1888	Sections 1, 2, 3 (partial), 4, 5, subsection (7), 10, 14, 40, subsections (1), (4) and (5), 41, subsection (6), 54, 57, 59, subsections (1) and (3) to (6), 60–62, 54, subsection (3) (partial), 75 (partial), 79, subsection (1) and (3) (partial), 80, 83 (partial), 87 (partial), 88, 92, subsection (1), 100 (partial), 118–120, 122 and 124.
53 & 54 Vict. c. 71	Bankruptcy Act 1890	Section 9 (partial).
53 & 54 Vict. c. ccxliii	London Council (General Powers) Act 1890	Section 23.
54 & 55 Vict. c. 68	County Council (Elections) Act 1891	The whole act.
55 & 56 Vict. c. 15	Charity Inquiries (Expenses) Act 1892	Section 1, subsection (2).
55 & 56 Vict. c. 45	Military Lands Act 1892	Sections 4 and 11, subsection (1), paragraphs (b) and (d).
55 & 56 Vict. c. 53	Public Libraries Act 1892	Sections 15 (partial) and 19 (partial).
56 & 57 Vict. c. 55	Metropolis Management (Plumstead and Hackney) Act 1893	Sections 3 (partial), 4–9 and 11–13.
56 & 57 Vict. c. 73	Local Government Act 1894	Section 31, Part III, sections 46, 48, 68, 69, 72, 73, 80, 83 and 85–89.
56 & 57 Vict. c. ccxxi	London County Council (General Powers) Act 1893	Sections 10–12 and 24. Schedule.
57 & 58 Vict. c. 57	Diseases of Animals Act 1894	Sections 33 (partial) and 40, subsection (1), except so far as it relates to the City of London and subsection (2), paragraph (i).
58 & 59 Vict. c. 32	Local Government (Stock Transfer) Act 1895	The whole act.
58 & 59 Vict. c. cxxvii	London County Council (General Powers) Act 1895	Section 44.
61 & 62 Vict. c. ccxxi	London County Council (General Powers) Act 1898	Section 60.
52 & 63 Vict. c. 14	London Government Act 1899	Sections 1–3, 4 (partial), 5, subsections (3) and (4), 6, subsections (5) and (6), 7–9, 10 (partial), 11 (partial), 15–18, 19, subsections (1) and (2), 20, 21, 24–27, 28, subsection (1), 32, subsection (4), 32 and 33. The First Schedule and Second Schedule, so much of Part II as relates to section 65 of the Local Government Act 1888.
62 & 63 Vict. c. 44	Small Dwellings Acquisition Act 1899	Section 9 (partial).
63 & 64 Vict. c. 13	County Councils (Elections) Amendment Act 1900	The whole act.
2 Edw. 7. c. 17	Midwives Act 1902	Section 15.
3 Edw. 7. c. 9	County Council (Bills in Parliament) Act 1903	The whole act.
3 Edw. 7. c. 14	Borough Funds Act 1903	The whole act.
3 Edw. 7. c. 15	Local Government (Transfer of Powers) Act 1903	The whole act.
3 Edw. 7. c. lxxxvoo	London County Council (General Powers) Act 1903	Section 52 (partial).
6 Edw. 7. c. 25	Open Spaces Act 1906	Sections 17, paragraph (a) and (b) and 18 (partial).
6 Edw. 7. c. 33	Local Authorities (Treasury Powers) Act 1906	Section 1 (partial).
6 Edw. 7. c. cl	London County Council (General Powers) Act 1906	Section 30.
7 Edw. 7. c. 27	Advertisements in Regulation Act 1907	Sections 3, subsection (6), except so far as relates to the City of London and 4 (partial).
7 Edw. 7. c. 33	Qualification of Women (County and Borough Councils) Act 1907	The whole act
7 Edw. 7. c. clxxv	London County Council (General Powers) Act 1907	Section 3 (partial). Part VII.
8 Edw. 7. c. 13	Polling Districts (County Councils) Act 1908	The whole act.
9 Edw. 7. c. 34	Electric Lighting Act 1909	Section 21.
10 Edw. 7. & 1 Geo 5. c. xxix	London County Council (General Powers) Act 1910	Section 45.
2 & 3 Geo. 5. c. cv	London County Council (Finance Consolidation) Act 1912	Section 46.
3 & 4 Geo. 5. c. 28	Mental Deficiency Act 1913	Section 38, subsection (3).
4 & 5 Geo. 5. c. 21	County and Borough Councils (Qualification) Act 1914	The whole act.
5 & 6 Geo. 5. c. 64	Notification of Births (Extension) Act 1915	Section 2, subsection (2).
5 & 6 Geo. 5. c. ciii	London County Council (General Powers) Act 1915	Section 60.
6 & 7 Geo. 5. c. 43	War Charities Act 1916	Section 2 (partial)
7 & 8 Geo. 5. c. 64	Representation of the People Act 1918	Section 10. In the Sixth Schedule, paragraph (5).
9 & 10 Geo. 5. c. 59	Land Settlement (Facilities) Act 1919	Section 24 (partial).
11 & 12 Geo. 5. c. 51	Education Act 1921	Sections 4 (partial), 10 (partial), 145 and 157 (partial). In the First Schedule, Parts II and III.
11 & 12 Geo. 5. c. 67	Local Authorities (Financial Provisions) Act 1921	Sections 3 (partial), 4 and 6, so far as relates to borough councils.
11 & 12 Geo. 5. c. l	London County Council (General Powers) Act 1921	Section 30.
12 & 13 Geo. 5. c. 46	Electricity (Supply) Act 1922	Sections 2 (partial) and 5 (partial).
12 & 13 Geo. 5. c. 51	Allotments Act 1922	Section 18 (partial).
13 & 14 Geo. 5. c. 25	Housing, &c. Act 1923	Section 22, paragraph (f).
14 & 15 Geo. 5. c. lvii	London County Council (General Powers) Act 1924	Sections 4 (partial), 55 and 60.
14 & 15 Geo. 5. c. lx	London County Council (Money) Act 1924	Section 6.
15 & 16 Geo. 5. c. 11	Borough Councillors (Alteration of Number) Act 1925	The whole act.
15 & 16 Geo. 5. c. 50	Theatrical Employers Registration Act 1925	Section 12 (partial).
16 & 17 Geo. 5. c. 59	Coroners (Amendment) Act 1926	Section 1 (partial).
16 & 17 Geo. 5. c. xcviii	London County Council (General Powers) Act 1926	Sections 36 and 43.
17 & 18 Geo. 5. c. 14	Poor Law Act 1927	The whole act so far as unrepealed.
17 & 18 Geo. 5. c. 31	Audit (Local Authorities) Act 1927	The whole act.
17 & 18 Geo. 5. c. xii	London County Council (General Powers) Act 1927	Sections 57 and 62.
18 & 19 Geo. 5. c. lxxvii	London County Council (General Powers) Act 1928	Section 31.
19 & 20 Geo. 5. c. 17	Local Government Act 1929	Sections 9, 10, 48, 51, except so far as relates to the City of London, 64, 115 (partial) and 129 (partial). The Seventh Schedule, except so far as relates to the City of London.
19 & 20 Geo. 5. c. lxxxvii	London County Council (General Powers) Act 1929	Sections 59, 61 and 62.
20 & 21 Geo. 5. c. 17	Poor Law Act 1930	Sections 7, 10 (partial), 110, 114, 136 (partial), 140, 144, 155 and 160, subsections (2), (4), (5) and (7).
21 & 22 Geo. 5. c. lix	London County Council (General Powers) Act 1931	Section 49.
22 & 23 Geo. 5. c. 48	Town and Country Planning Act 1932	Sections 38 (partial) and 50 (partial).
23 & 24 Geo. 5. c. 12	Children and Young Persons Act 1933	Sections 27, subsection (3), 96, subsection (5), paragraph (a) and 98 (subsection (2).
23 & 24 Geo. 5. c. xxvii	London County Council (General Powers) Act 1933	Sections 65 and 67, subsection (1).
24 & 25 Geo. 5. c. xl	London County Council (General Powers) Act 1934	Section 3 (partial). Parts IV, V and VI. Sections 62 and 76. The Schedule.
25 & 26 Geo. 5. c. xxxiii	London County Council (General Powers) Act 1935	Sections 62, 63 and 65.
26 Geo. 5 & 1 Edw. 8. c. 49	Public Health Act 1936	Section 342, subsection (2), paragraph (ii).
26 Geo. 5 & 1 Edw. 8. c. 50	Public Health (London) Act 1936	Sections 7, 8, 9, subsections (1), (2), (3) and (6), 10–12, 57 (partial), 74, 96, subsection (5), 167, subsections (3) and (4), 168, subsection (1), 175, 176, 192, subsection (1) so far as it relates to membership of a local authority, 230, subsection (1), paragraph (a), 267, subsection (2), paragraph (a), 273, so far as it relates to borough councils, 275, subsection (1), paragraphs (b) and (c) so far as they relate to a local authority, 284, so far as it relates to a local authority, 287, subsection (2), 288, 290, subsection (1), 297, subsections (2) to (4), 300, subsection 91), so far as it relates to a local authority, 301, so far as it relates to a local authority, 303, so far as it relates to section 34 of the Public Health Act 1872. In the First Schedule, Part V. In the Second Schedule, so much of Part I as applies section 62, 139, 149 and 156 of the Metropolis Management Act 1855 and section 20 of the Metropolis Management Amendment Act 1862.
26 Geo. 5 & 1 Edw. 8. c. 51	Housing Act 1936	Sections 8, subsection (5), 84, subsection (6), 117 (partial), 119, paragraph (c) and proviso (ii), 183, subsection (1), 185, except so far as it relates to the City of London and 186.
26 Geo. 5 & 1 Edw. 8. c. lx	London County Council (General Powers) Act 1936	Sections 42, 44, 50 and 55.
1 Edw. 8 & 1 Geo. 6. c. xci	London County Council (General Powers) Act 1937	Section 131.
1 & 2 Geo. 6. c. 56	Food and Drugs Act 1938	Sections 17, subsection 94) so far as it relates to a local authority, 75 (partial) and 96, subsection (2), paragraph (b).
