= London Government Act 1899 =

Act of the Parliament of the United Kingdom

London Government Act 1899 (Note: Section 35.)
- Act of Parliament
- Parliament of the United Kingdom
- Long title: An Act to make better provision for Local Government in London.
- Citation: 62 & 63 Vict. c. 14
- Introduced by: Arthur Balfour MP (Commons)
- Territorial extent: United Kingdom

Dates
- Royal assent: 13 July 1899
- Commencement: 1 November 1900 (Note: Section 33.)
- Repealed: 1 April 1965
Other legislation
Amended by	Qualification of Women (County and Borough Councils) Act 1907; Representation of the People Act 1918; Housing Act 1925; Solicitors Act 1932; Local Government Act 1933; Public Health (London) Act 1936; London Government Act 1939; Representation of the People Act 1948; Statute Law Revision Act 1950; Statute Law Revision Act 1959; Charities Act 1960; London Government Act 1963
Repealed by	The Local Law (Greater London Council and Inner London Boroughs) Order 1965
Relates to	Local Government Act 1888; London Government Act 1963

Status: Repealed

Text of statute as originally enacted

The London Government Act 1899 (62 & 63 Vict. c. 14) was an act of the Parliament of the United Kingdom that reformed the administration of the capital. The act divided the County of London into 28 metropolitan boroughs, replacing the 42 local authorities administering the area. The legislation also transferred a few powers from the London County Council to the boroughs, and removed a number of boundary anomalies. The first elections to the new boroughs were held on 1 November 1900.

== Background ==
While an elected London County Council had been created by the Local Government Act 1888 (51 & 52 Vict. c. 41), the lower tier of local government still consisted of elective vestries and district boards of works created in 1855 by the Metropolis Management Act 1855 (18 & 19 Vict. c. 120), responsible for local drainage, paving, lighting, street repairs, the removal of nuisances etc. In addition, there were a number of areas outside the jurisdiction of any local authority.

In 1893, a Royal Commission on the Unification of London had been established with the purpose of making proposals on the amalgamation of the City of London with the county. In its report in 1894, the commission recommended increasing the power of the county council over the vestries and boards, with county councillors becoming ex officio members of the lower authorities, and the LCC gaining powers to frame by-laws to govern them.

In reaction to the report, the vestries sought a strengthening of the second tier of government in the capital. Charters of incorporation as a municipal borough were sought in 1896–1897 by Paddington vestry, the parishes of the City of Westminster and in Kensington.

The London Municipal Society had been formed in 1894 to support the pro-Unionist Moderate candidates in London local elections. The stated policy of the society at the 1897 vestry elections was "conferring on the local authorities of the metropolis municipal dignity and privileges". In July the society urged the Government to introduce legislation to create municipalities in London.

In February 1898, a deputation attended the Prime Minister, Lord Salisbury, and presented him with a memorial calling for municipal government in London. The common seals of nineteen vestries were affixed to the document. Later in the year two private bills to create boroughs in London were introduced to the Commons, one by the member of Parliament for Islington West, Thomas Lough, and the second by a group of London local authorities.

== Passage ==
Leave to bring in the London Government Bill to the House of Commons was given to the Leader of the House, Arthur Balfour MP, the President of the Local Government Board, Henry Chaplin MP, the Attorney General, Richard Webster MP and the Solicitor General, Sir Robert Finlay MP on 23 February 1899. The bill had its first reading in the House of Commons on 23 February 1899, presented by Arthur Balfour MP. The bill was given precedence over all other business for all days on which the bill was debated. The bill had its second reading in the House of Commons on 24 March 1899 and was committed to a committee of the whole house, which met on 24 April 1899, 25 April 1899, 4 May 1899, 8 May 1899, 9 May 1899, 15 May 1899, 16 May 1899 and 18 May 1899 and reported on 6 June 1899, with amendments. The amended bill was considered and agreed to by the House of Commons on 6 June 1899 and 8 June 1899, with amendments. The amended bill had its third reading in the House of Commons on 13 June 1899, and passed with amendments.

The amended bill had its first reading in the House of Lords on 15 June 1899. The bill had its second reading in the House of Lords on 20 June 1899 and was committed to a committee of the whole house, which met on 27 June 1899 and reported on 3 July 1899, with amendments. The amended bill had its third reading in the House of Lords on 4 July 1899, with amendments.

The amended bill was considered and agreed to by the House of Commons on 6 July 1899, with amendments. The amended bill was considered and agreed to by the House of Lords on 7 July 1899.

The bill received royal assent on 13 July.

The bill provided for the division of the administrative county of London, except the City of London, into metropolitan boroughs. Each borough was to be governed by a borough council consisting of a mayor, aldermen and councillors, the total number of which was not to exceed seventy-two.

The bill did not define areas for all the boroughs, but denoted sixteen existing parishes or districts that should become boroughs:

- The parishes of Battersea, Camberwell, Chelsea, Fulham, Hammersmith, Hampstead, Islington, Kensington, Lambeth, Lewisham, Paddington, St Marylebone and St Pancras
- The districts of Poplar and Wandsworth
- The ancient parliamentary borough of Westminster

The remaining boroughs were to be made up of combinations of existing authorities with a rateable value exceeding 500,000 pounds or with a population of between 100,000 and 400,000 inhabitants.

=== Debate ===
The parliamentary debate centred on three issues: the boundaries of the boroughs, the need for aldermen on the councils and the admission of women to the councils.

==== Boundaries ====
Concern was voiced in the Commons by Thomas Lough and Richard Haldane (MP for Haddingtonshire in Scotland) about the fact that the boundaries of the boroughs not listed in the bill were to be fixed by boundary commissioners without parliamentary oversight. The conditions for constituting boroughs were altered with rateable value only being considered where the population was less than 100,000, allowing the commissioners to consider the creation of smaller boroughs.

Sydney Buxton (MP for Tower Hamlets, Poplar) was concerned that the upper population limit would lead to very large boroughs being formed in the east of London.

In the Lords, debate on the boundaries continued. An amendment by Lord Tweedmouth to ensure that the "Tower of London, and the liberties thereof" was included in the schedule with the area of the Whitechapel District was accepted. A second, unsuccessful, amendment was tabled by the Peer to divide the Wandsworth District into two boroughs: one comprising the parishes of Wandsworth and Putney; and the other Clapham, Streatham and Tooting. Lord Tweedmouth felt the area of the proposed borough was unwieldy, and his division was a natural one by means of Wandsworth Common. Lord Hawkesbury felt that the area of the parliamentary borough of Westminster was "far too large to be economically worked", and sought to divide it into two. The amendment was defeated.

==== Aldermen ====
Edward Pickersgill, member for Bethnal Green South West moved to have aldermen removed from the borough councils. This was partly because he disagreed with aldermen on principle, but also because the creation of 400 or 500 new aldermen would "make the institution ridiculous and would accelerate its extinction". The amendment was defeated, with 140 votes for and 245 against.

==== Women members ====
Edmund Boulnois, member for Marylebone East moved an amendment to ban women from being mayors, aldermen or councillors of the new boroughs. Women had been elected members and chairmen of the existing vestries and district boards, and it followed that they could be elected to the new councils. Mr Boulnois believed that the work of the councils would be "distasteful to women" and that it would be "a pity to drag women into the turmoil of an election on political lines". He reminded members "If they allowed women to sit on these councils they would not be able to withhold from them the Parliamentary franchise and the right to sit and vote in that house." The amendment was carried with a majority of 102. This was not the end of the issue, however. On 6 June at the report stage an amendment was carried allowing women to be councillors or aldermen (but not mayors) of the metropolitan boroughs. This was overturned during the second reading on a motion by Lord Dunraven in the House of Lords on 26 June. The Lords amendment was accepted by the Commons on 6 July by a majority of 243 to 174.

== Provisions ==
=== Metropolitan boroughs ===
Section 1 of the act provided that "The whole of the administrative county of London, excluding the city of London, shall be divided into metropolitan boroughs".

Section 2 of the act provided that "The council of each borough shall consist of a mayor, alderman, and councillors. Provided that no woman shall be eligible for any such office." The chairman of the council was to have the title of mayor. Boroughs were to be divided into wards of three councillors and aldermen at a ratio of one to every six councillors with the total number for each borough not to exceed 70. This followed the practice for the London County Council, rather than municipal boroughs, where the ratio was one alderman for every three councillors.

Section 3 of the act set dates for the first election of councillors for 1 November 1900 and the ordinary day of election of councillors to be 1 November (or the following day if Sunday) and of mayors and aldermen for 9 November (or the following day if Sunday), with a third of the councillors going out of office each year.

Unlike the municipal boroughs which received this status by the grant of a charter of incorporation, the metropolitan boroughs had no charters, being created by act of Parliament.

=== Powers transferred to the boroughs ===
Section 4 of the act transferred the powers and functions of vestries and district boards to borough councils. Section 4(1) provided that every elected vestry and district board in the county of London would cease to exist, with the powers, properties and liabilities of the abolished authorities transferring to the metropolitan boroughs.

Section 5 of the act transferred powers from the London County Council to borough councils.

Section 5(1) transferred a few minor powers and duties.

- Under the London Building Act 1894: the licensing of wooden structures and the removal of unauthorised signs and obstructions.
- Under the Public Health (London) Act 1891: the licensing of dairymen.

Section 5(2) allowed borough councils to exercise some powers concurrently with the county council within their own boundaries:

- Under the London Building Act 1894: the demolition of buildings and regulation of stacked timber.
- Under the Metropolis Water Act 1871: the regulation of water companies.
- Under the Railway and Canal Traffic Act 1888: the power to appear in opposition to certain complaints.
- Under the Local Government Act 1888: the power to acquire land.
- Under the Housing of the Working Classes Act 1890: the housing of the working classes.
- Under the Municipal Corporations Act 1882: the power to make byelaws.

Section 5(3) allowed for the London County Council and the metropolitan boroughs to transfer powers to and from each other, if both the county council and a majority of the boroughs agreed. Section 5(4) provided a similar mechanism in regard to the county council and the common council of the City of London.

Section 6 of the act transferred additional powers and duties to borough councils.

- By section 6(1), all main roads within a borough were transferred to their charge.
- By section 6(2), borough councils took over highway maintenance from the London County Council, including associated costs.
- By section 6(3), borough councils could close or stop up streets under the Metropolis Management Amendment Act 1862.
- By section 6(4), borough councils became responsible for enforcing bylaws related to dairies, milk, slaughterhouses, and knackers' yards.
- By section 6(5), borough councils could alienate land with Local Government Board consent and use proceeds as sanctioned by the Board.
- By section 6(6), borough councils were given powers to promote and oppose Bills in Parliament and take legal action to protect inhabitants' interests, similar to councils outside London under the Borough Funds Act 1872.

=== Borough formation ===
Section 15 of the act gave "Her Majesty in Council" the power to set up London borough councils and establish boundaries. Draft orders were to be prepared by a body of commissioners and presented to both Houses of Parliament for at least 30 days during a parliamentary session. Either House could object, meaning the order could not be made.

Draft orders for Battersea, Bermondsey, Bethnal Green, Deptford, Fulham, Greenwich, Hackney, Hammersmith, Hampstead, Islington, Lambeth, Lewisham, Poplar, St. Marylebone, Shoreditch, Southwark, Stoke Newington, Wandsworth and Woolwich were laid before parliament on 13 March 1900.

=== Detached parts of parishes ===
Section 18 of the act provided that every part of a parish in the county of London that was wholly detached from the principal part of the parish was to be annexed or divided to the borough which it adjoined. Any detached part of another county surrounded by the county of London was to be transferred to the latter county, and incorporated into a metropolitan borough, while any part of the county of London surrounded by another county was to be similarly transferred.

Notable examples of parishes affected were:

- South Hornsey, in Middlesex which consisted of two detached pieces entirely surrounded by the county of London, which was incorporated into the metropolitan borough of Stoke Newington
- Alexandra Park, an exclave of the parish of Clerkenwell and county of London, locally in Middlesex, which was transferred to the parish of Hornsey in the latter county.
- Chelsea and Kensington, both within the county of London had detached pieces adjoining or surrounded by the other parish, which were exchanged.
- Putney detached, consisting of the West Middlesex Waterworks Company reservoir at Lonsdale Road, transferred from Putney in the County of London to Barnes, Surrey.

=== Woolwich local board ===
A local board had been formed in Woolwich parish in 1852. It was the only parish in the metropolitan area to adopt legislation forming such a body. The board had a unique constitution, with some members elected and others nominated by the superintendent of the Royal Navy dockyard, the commanding officers of the Royal Engineers and the Royal Artillery, and the storekeeper of Her Majesty's Ordnance. Section 19 of the act dissolved the local board, with its powers passing to the metropolitan borough of Woolwich.

=== Penge ===
Penge was a detached part of the parish of Battersea, several miles from its parent parish, administered by the Lewisham District Board, and on the edge of the county of London as created in 1889. Section 20 of the act sought to deal with this anomaly. It allowed an Order in Council to either incorporate the township into either of the metropolitan boroughs of Lewisham or Camberwell, or to form it into an urban district in one or other of the counties of Surrey or Kent. In the event, Penge became an urban district in Kent.

=== Kensington Palace ===
Section 21 of the act allowed for Kensington Palace to be detached from the borough of Westminster and be transferred to the borough of Kensington by Order in Council, which was duly done. The presence of the palace with the borough led indirectly to its acquisition of "royal" status in 1901.

=== The Temples ===
Section 22 of the act deemed the Inner Temple and Middle Temple to be part of the City of London for the purposes of the act.

=== Church affairs ===
Section 23 of the act provided that powers and duties of vestries relating to affairs of the church remained with the vestries.

== Areas of the metropolitan boroughs ==
Schedule 1 of the act described the area of each of the 28 boroughs to be created but did not give them names. Where the borough consisted of a single parish, or followed the area of a parliamentary constituency then it would take its name. Section 27 of the act provided that, in other cases, an "appropriate name" was to be given to the borough by Order in Council.

1. City of London (not a metropolitan borough)
2. Westminster
3. Holborn
4. Finsbury
5. Shoreditch
6. Bethnal Green
7. Stepney
8. Bermondsey
9. Southwark
10. Camberwell
11. Deptford
12. Lewisham
13. Woolwich
14. Greenwich
15. Poplar
16. Hackney
17. Stoke Newington
18. Islington
19. St Pancras
20. Hampstead
21. St Marylebone
22. Paddington
23. Kensington
24. Hammersmith
25. Fulham
26. Wandsworth
27. Lambeth
28. Battersea
29. Chelsea

Borough	Area	Former authority
Battersea	Battersea Parish	Battersea Vestry
Bermondsey	The area consisting of the parishes of Rotherhithe, Bermondsey, Horsleydown and St. Olave and St. Thomas, Southwark	Bermondsey Vestry, Rotherhithe Vestry, St Olave District Board of Works
Bethnal Green	Bethnal Green Parish	Bethnal Green Vestry
Camberwell	Camberwell Parish	Camberwell Vestry
Chelsea	Chelsea Parish	Chelsea Vestry
Deptford	The area consisting of the parliamentary borough of Deptford	Greenwich District Board of Works (part)
Finsbury	The area consisting of the parliamentary divisions of East and Central Finsbury	Clerkenwell Vestry, St. Luke Vestry, Holborn District Board of Works (part), Charterhouse (extra parochial place)
Fulham	Fulham Parish	Fulham Vestry
Greenwich	The area consisting of the parliamentary borough of Greenwich	Greenwich District Board of Works (part)
Hackney	Hackney Parish	Hackney Vestry
Hammersmith	Hammersmith Parish	Hammersmith Vestry
Hampstead	Hampstead Parish	Hampstead Vestry
Holborn	The area consisting of the parliamentary division of Holborn	Holborn District Board of Works (part), Funival's Inn, Gray's Inn, Staple Inn (extra parochial places)
Islington	Islington Parish	Islington Vestry
Kensington	Kensington Parish	Kensington Vestry
Lambeth	Lambeth Parish	Lambeth Vestry
Lewisham	The area consisting of the parliamentary borough of Lewisham	Lee District Board of Works (part), Lewisham District Board of Works
Paddington	Paddington Parish	Parish vestry
Poplar	The district of the Poplar Board of Works	Poplar District Board of Works
St. Marylebone	St. Marylebone Parish	St. Marylebone Vestry
St. Pancras	St. Pancras Parish	St. Pancras Vestry
Shoreditch	Shoreditch Parish	Shoreditch Vestry
Southwark	The area consisting of the parishes of St. George the Martyr, Christchurch, Southwark, St. Saviour, Southwark and Newington	Newington Vestry, Southwark St. George the Martyr Vestry, St Saviour's District Board of Works
Stepney	The area consisting of the parishes of Mile End Old Town and St. George in the East and the districts of the Limehouse and Whitechapel Boards of Works, including the Tower of London and the liberties thereof	Mile End Old Town Vestry, St. George in the East Vestry, Limehouse District Board of Works, Whitechapel District Board of Works, Tower of London (extra parochial place)
Stoke Newington	The area consisting of the parish of Stoke Newington and of the urban district of South Hornsey, or so much thereof as may be incorporated with the county of London under the act	Stoke Newington Vestry
Wandsworth	The area consisting of the district of the Wandsworth Board of Works	Wandsworth District Board of Works (part)
Westminster	The area consisting of the ancient parliamentary borough of Westminster, compromising the parishes of St. Margaret and St. John, Westminster, St. George, Hanover Square, St James, Westminster and the district of the Strand Board of Works, and including the Close of the Collegiate Church of St. Peter and the Liberty of the Rolls	St. Margaret and St. John, Vestry, St. George, Hanover Square Vestry, St. Martin in the Fields Vestry, St. James, Westminster Vestry, Strand District Board of Works, Westminster District Board of Works, Close of the Collegiate Church of St. Peter (extra parochial place)
Woolwich	The area consisting of the parliamentary borough of Woolwich	Plumstead Vestry, Woolwich Vestry, Lee District Board of Works (part)

== Subsequent developments ==
Sections 8 and 9 of the act were repealed by section 207 of, and the eighth schedule to, the London Government Act 1939 (2 & 3 Geo. 6. c. 40), which came into force on 1 January 1940.

The whole act was repealed by section 5 of, and the third schedule to, the Local Law (Greater London Council and Inner London Boroughs) Order 1965 (SI 1965/540), made under the London Government Act 1963.
