= Fulham District (Metropolis) =

District in London

Fulham
- Board of works district
- 1855–1886
- Interactive map of Fulham District
- Status: Board of works district
- Government: Fulham District Board of Works
  - Type: District board of works
- Historical era: 19th century
  - Established: 1855
  - Disestablished: 1886
- Contained within
  - District: The Metropolis
- Subdivisions
  - Type: Civil parishes
  - Units: Hammersmith; Fulham
- Today part of: London Borough of Hammersmith and Fulham

Fulham was a local government district within the metropolitan area of London, England from 1855 to 1886. It was formed by the Metropolis Management Act 1855 and was governed by the Fulham District Board of Works, which consisted of elected vestrymen nominated by the parish vestries of Fulham and Hammersmith.

It was in the part of the county of Middlesex that was within the area of the Metropolitan Board of Works. It occupied broadly the same area as ancient parish of Fulham and that of the current London Borough of Hammersmith and Fulham.

== History ==
=== Establishment ===
The district comprised the civil parishes of Fulham and Hammersmith.

Under the Metropolis Management Act 1855 any parish that exceeded 2,000 ratepayers was to be divided into wards; however the parishes of Fulham District did not exceed this number so were not divided into wards.

In 1873 the population had increased enough for the parish of Hammersmith to be divided into three wards (electing vestrymen): North (24), Centre (27) and South (21).

In 1883–84 the population had increased enough for the parish of Fulham to also be divided into three wards (electing vestrymen): North End (27), Walham (27) and South Fulham (18).

=== Abolishment ===
On 25 March 1886, following the passing of the Metropolis Management Amendment Act 1885, the Fulham District Board of Works was dissolved and vestries of Hammersmith and Fulham were incorporated, with elections to the Metropolitan Board of Works to be held on that date. In 1900, the parishes of Fulham and Hammersmith became Metropolitan Borough of Fulham and the Metropolitan Borough of Hammersmith. In 1965, the metropolitan boroughs were merged to form London Borough of Hammersmith, later renamed to the London Borough of Hammersmith and Fulham in 1979.

== Governance ==
The local authority was the Fulham District Board of Works. 24 members of the district board were nominated by Hammersmith Vestry and 15 by the Fulham Vestry. The district board nominated one member to the Metropolitan Board of Works.

== Population ==
The population of the district at each census was:

Year	1851	1861	1871	1881
Population (Fulham)	11,866	15,539	23,350	42,900
Population (Hammersmith)	17,760	24,519	42,691	71,939
Total	29,626	40,058	66,041	114,839
