= Metropolis Management Amendment Act 1885 =

Act of the Parliament of the United Kingdom

Metropolis Management Amendment Act 1885 (Note: Section 9.)
- Act of Parliament
- Parliament of the United Kingdom
- Long title: An Act to amend the Metropolis Management Acts.
- Citation: 48 & 49 Vict. c. 33
- Introduced by: William Legge, 6th Earl of Dartmouth MP (Commons)
- Territorial extent: United Kingdom

Dates
- Royal assent: 31 July 1885
- Commencement: 31 July 1885 (Note: Section 1.)
- Repealed: 1 April 1965
Other legislation
Amends	Metropolis Management Act 1855
Amended by	Statute Law Revision Act 1898
Repealed by	London Government Act 1963
Relates to	Superannuation (Metropolis) Act 1866

Status: Repealed

History of passage through Parliament

Records of Parliamentary debate relating to the statute from Hansard

Text of statute as originally enacted

The Metropolis Management Amendment Act 1885 (48 & 49 Vict. c. 33) was an act of the Parliament of the United Kingdom that amended the Metropolis Management Act 1855 (18 & 19 Vict. c. 120) and other Metropolis Management Acts.

== Background ==
The Metropolis Management Act 1855 (18 & 19 Vict. c. 120) created the Metropolitan Board of Works, a London-wide body to co-ordinate the construction of the city's infrastructure and created a second tier of local government consisting of parish vestries and district boards of works.

Since the passing of the Metropolis Management Act 1855 (18 & 19 Vict. c. 120), several parishes and districts had increased in population and rateable value, resulting in the need to increase representation on the Metropolitan Board of Works.

== Passage ==
Leave to bring in the Metropolis Management Acts Acts Amendment Bill to the House of Commons was granted to Viscount Lewisham MP, Sir Charles Mills MP, Sir Trevor Lawrence MP, James Stuart MP, William Grantham MP and Thomas Boord MP on 23 April 1885. The bill had its first reading in the House of Commons and on 23 April 1885, presented by Viscount Lewisham MP. The bill had its second reading in the House of Commons on 2 May 1885 and was committed to a committee of the whole house, which met on 18 May 1885 and 4 June 1885 and reported on 6 July 1885, with amendments relating to the Hammersmith and Fulham District Board and Fulham District officers. The amended bill had its third reading in the House of Commons on 6 July 1885 and passed, without amendments.

The bill had its first reading in the House of Lords on 7 July 1885. The bill had its second reading in the House of Lords on 17 July 1885 and was committed to a committee of the whole house, which met reported on 21 July 1885, without amendments. The amended bill had its third reading in the House of Lords on 23 July 1885 and passed, without amendments.

The bill was granted royal assent on 31 July 1885.

== Provisions ==
Section 1 of the act provided that the vestries of the parishes of St Mary Islington, Lambeth, Saint Pancras and Saint Mary Abbott Kensington and the district of Wandsworth were each entitled to elect 3 members to the Metropolitan Board of Works and that the vestries of the parishes of Camberwell and Paddington and the districts of Greenwich, Hackney and Poplar each entitled to elect 2 members to the Metropolitan Board of Works.

Section 2 of the act separated the districts of Plumstead and Lewisham for the purpose of electing members to the Metropolitan Board of Works, with the first elections to take place on 1 October 1885.

Section 3 of the act dissolved the district of Fulham and incorporated the vestries of Hammersmith and Fulham on 25 March 1886 each entitled to elect 1 member to the Metropolitan Board of Works, with the first elections to take place on 25 March 1886.

Section 4 of the act provided that a third of members of the Metropolitan Board of Works elected under the act would go out of office on the second Wednesday of June 1886, one third on the second Wednesday in June 1887 and the other third on the second Wednesday of June 1888, determined by lot.

Section 5 of the act provided that all members elected under the act would be subject to the provisions of the Metropolis Management Act 1855 (18 & 19 Vict. c. 120).

Section 6 of the act provided that the act and the Metropolis Management Act 1855 (18 & 19 Vict. c. 120), and all subsequent amending acts, would be construed together as one act.

Section 7 of the act provided that each byelaw and regulation made by the Fulham District Board of Works would continue in force until repealed or altered, with assets determined a principal secretary of state.

Section 8 of the act provided that officers of the dissolved Fulham District Board of Works appointed within a year to the vestries of St Peter's or St Paul's, Hammersmith would have their time served in the board of works contribute to their superannuation under the Superannuation (Metropolis) Act 1866 (29 & 30 Vict. c. 31).

== Subsequent developments ==
The preamble, sections one and two, section three, to “dissolved, and,” “from that date,” and from “The vestry” to the end of the section, sections four and five and section seven from “The property, claims and demands” to the end of the section, were repealed by section 1 of, and the first part of the schedule to, the Statute Law Revision Act 1898 (61 & 62 Vict. c. 22), which came into force on 25 July 1898.

Sections seven and eight were repealed by section 207 of, and the eighth schedule to, the London Government Act 1939 (2 & 3 Geo. 6. c. 40), which came into force on 1 January 1940.

The whole act was repealed by the London Government Act 1963, which came into force on 31 July 1963. The 1963 act created Greater London and a new local government structure within it.
