= Lewisham Council (disambiguation) =

Lewisham Council could refer to:

- Lewisham London Borough Council, created in 1965
- Lewisham Metropolitan Borough Council, 1900 to 1965
- Lewisham District Board of Works, 1855 to 1900
