= Fulham District Board of Works =

Board of works in England

Type
- Type: Board of works for the Fulham District

History
- Founded: 1855
- Disbanded: 1886

Structure
- Committees: 24 members (Hammersmith Vestry); 15 members (Fulham Vestry)
- Joint committees: Appointed 1 member to the Metropolitan Board of Works

The Fulham District Board of Works (also known as the Board of Works for the Fulham District) was a board of works for the Fulham District, that comprised the civil parishes of Fulham and Hammersmith, from 1855 to 1886.

== History ==
=== Establishment ===
In 1855, following the passing of the Metropolis Management Act 1855, the parishes of Fulham and Hammersmith were combined for civil purposes as the Fulham District, governed by the Fulham District Board of Works. This coincided with the parishes becoming part of the area of responsibility of the Metropolitan Board of Works.

The Fulham Vestry and Hammersmith Vestry continued to exist as a non-administrative vestries with their main responsibility to appoint members to the Fulham District Board of Works in June each year.

24 members of the district board came from the Hammersmith Vestry and 15 from the Fulham Vestry. The board nominated one member to the Metropolitan Board of Works.

=== Abolishment ===
The Metropolis Management Amendment Act 1885 made provision for the Fulham District Board of Works to be dissolved. A local inquiry was held on 16 March 1886 to apportion assets between the two vestries. On 25 March 1886, the board was dissolved and the administrative vestries of Hammersmith and Fulham were incorporated.

== Board members ==
=== 1855 ===
Elections for the first board were held on 28 November 1855. The elected members and officers were:

==== Fulham ====
| Name | Address |
|---|---|
| Ariel, J., Esq. | William Street |
| Cosheal, J. | York End |
| Flicker, R. | Church Street |
| Gladman, C. | Vale Place |
| Guazzaroni, J. J. | North End |
| Hamilton, J. | North End |
| Johnson, R. | North End |
| King, W., Esq. | Bridge Street |
| Lammin, W. H. | Walham Green |
| Matyear, W. | Crab Tree |
| Potter, W. | London Road |
| Pitts, G. | Walham Green |
| Porter, J. R. | Walham Green |
| Scholfield, J. | North End |
| Thatcher, W., Esq. | North End |

==== Hammersmith ====
| Name | Address |
|---|---|
| Ainsworth, W. F. Esq. | Ravenscourt Square |
| Aldridge, T. H. | Shepherd's Bush |
| Axton, G. | Norland Road |
| Brown, G. | Westcroft Place |
| Brown, G. | King Street |
| Chapman, W. H. | New Road |
| Chalmers, J. | Grove Lane |
| Crookes, J. | Brook Green |
| Clark, F. L. | King Street |
| Fitchew, W. | Willoughby House |
| Hunt, J. | Broadway |
| Haber, H. | New Road |
| Hurst, J. J., Esq. | Brook Green Ter. |
| Johnson, W. | Broadway |
| Munday, J. | Gold Hawk Terrace |
| Neal, H. | Gold Hawk Terrace |
| Osmond, S. | King Street |
| Phillippart, Sir J. | College House |
| Periy, R., Esq. | St. Peter's Square |
| Richardson, C., Esq. | Uxbridge Road |
| Smith, T. M. | Elm Grove |
| Simpson, W. | Queen Street |
| Wells, W. | Brook Green |
| Walmsley, R. | Middle Mall |

==== Other Officers ====
- Representative to Metropolitan Board: V. Stevens, Esq., Brook Green, Hammersmith
- Medical Officer of Health: F. J. Burge, Esq., New Road, Hammersmith
- Surveyor: Mr. A. C. Bean, Shaftesbury Road, Hammersmith
- Clerk: Mr. W. Lovett, Broadway House, Hammersmith
- Inspectors of Nuisances:
  - Mr. W. Richmond, Walham Green
  - Mr. J. Lawrance, Brook Green Lane
