= Hammersmith Vestry =

Vestry in England

- Coat of arms of the Hammersmith Vestry

Type
- Type: Vestry of the parish of Hammersmith

History
- Founded: c.1631
- Disbanded: 1900
- Preceded by: Fulham Vestry
- Succeeded by: Hammersmith Metropolitan Borough Council

Structure
- Seats: 72 vestrymen
- Committees: 1863–1896: Appointed members to Hammersmith Burial Board; 1887–1896: Appointed 9 members to Hammersmith Library Commissioners
- Joint committees: 1855–1886: Appointed 24 members to Fulham District Board of Works; 1886–1889: Appointed 1 member to Metropolitan Board of Works
- Length of term: 3 years
- Constituencies: 1873–1894: 3 wards; 1894–1900: 6 wards

Elections
- Last election: 30 May 1899

Motto
- Spectemur agendo

Meeting place
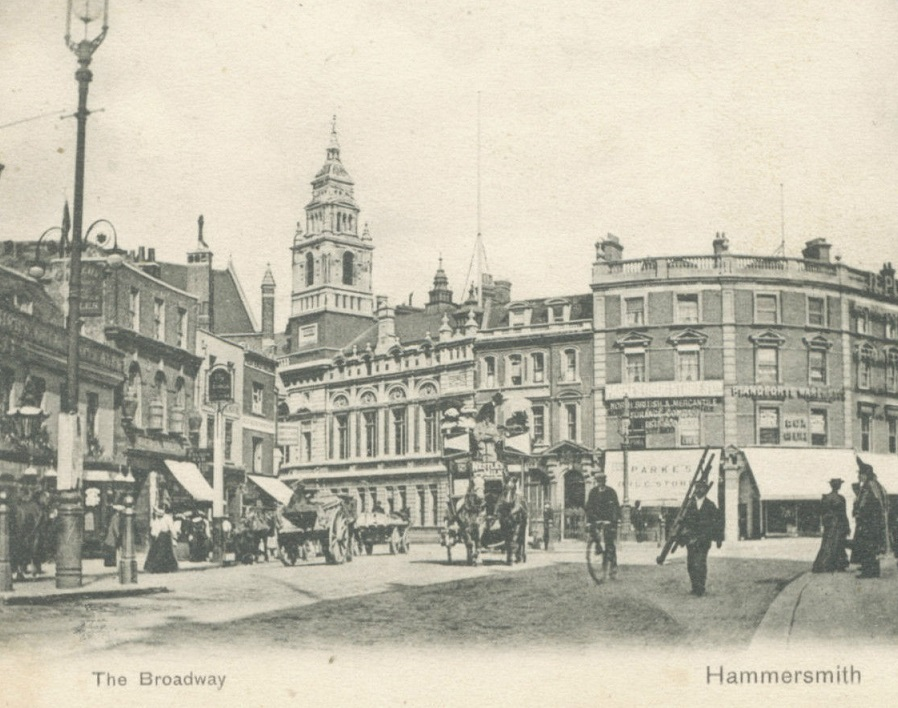
- Vestry Hall, Broadway

The Hammersmith Vestry was the vestry of Hammersmith from c.1631 to 1900. The vestry was established following the building of a chapel of ease for the inhabitants of Hammersmith in the parish of Fulham. Hammersmith became a distinct parish in 1834 and the vestry was also known as the Vestry of the Parish of Hammersmith.

Hammersmith was recombined with Fulham for most sanitary and civil purposes in 1855 which reduced the responsibilities of the Hammersmith Vestry. It was incorporated in 1886 as an administrative vestry within the Metropolitan Board of Works area. The vestry was replaced by Hammersmith Metropolitan Borough Council in 1900 with the final election to the vestry occurring on 30 May 1899.

== History ==
=== First vestry ===
In 1629, inhabitants of Hammersmith, including the Earl of Mulgrave and Nicholas Crispe, successfully petitioned the Bishop of London for a chapel of ease to be built at St Paul's Church, in Hammersmith. On 7 June 1631, the chapelry was consecrated by Bishop Laud. A perpetual curacy was established and the chapelry developed its own independent vestry.

From 1822 an annual election was held for a select vestry responsible only for poor law management. Administration of the poor law passed to the Kensington Guardians in 1837.

In 1834, upon the passing of the Hammersmith Parish Act 1834 (4 & 5 Will. 4. c. lxxv), Hammersmith became a distinct parish with St Paul's as the parish church and vicarage.

=== Fulham District Board of Works ===
In 1855, following the passing of the Metropolis Management Act 1855 (18 & 19 Vict. c. 120), the parishes of Fulham and Hammersmith were combined for civil purposes as the Fulham District, governed by the Fulham District Board of Works. This coincided with the parish becoming part of the area of responsibility of the Metropolitan Board of Works.

The Hammersmith Vestry continued to exist as a non-administrative vestry with its main responsibility to appoint members to the Fulham District Board of Works in June each year. Hammersmith Vestry appointed 24 of the 39 vestrymen to the district board.

The 1855 legislation altered the qualification of vestrymen to ratepayers of £40 (equivalent to £3,725 in 2025) annually and upwards, which meant in 1855 only 259 ratepayers were eligible for election to the vestry or could serve on the district board.

=== Burials ===
One of the responsibilities reserved for the non-administrative vestries was the power to set up burial boards to provide cemeteries. The board was appointed by the vestry on 24 June 1863. In November 1864 the board advertised for 10–15 acres of land within four miles of Hammersmith Broadway that would be suitable for a burial ground. The first internment at Hammersmith Cemetery took place in 1869. Following the Local Government Act 1894 (56 & 57 Vict. c. 73), the powers and duties of the burial board were absorbed by the vestry in 1896.

=== Incorporation as an administrative vestry ===
The Metropolis Management Amendment Act 1885 (48 & 49 Vict. c. 33) made provision for the Fulham District Board of Works to be dissolved. A local inquiry was held on 16 March 1886 to apportion assets between the two vestries. On 25 March 1886, the board was dissolved and the administrative vestries of Hammersmith and Fulham were incorporated. Hammersmith Vestry appointed one member to the Metropolitan Board of Works. (Note: Fulham District Board of Works had appointed one member. The replacement Fulham Vestry and Hammersmith Vestry nominated one member each.)

In 1892/3 the vestry had an expenditure of £54,310 (equivalent to £6,033,861 in 2025).

The election of vestrymen was reformed by the Local Government Act 1894 (56 & 57 Vict. c. 73) with the vestry election in December 1894 the first to use the new system. The 1894 election was for all members with the third elected with the fewest votes retiring in 1896, then the next third in 1897 and the third with the most votes in 1898. The final vestry election was held in May 1899.

The vestry used the powers of the Electric Lighting Acts to build Hammersmith power station. (Note: Authorised by the Hammersmith Electric Lighting Order 1893) Electric supply service began in October 1897.

=== Public libraries ===
The Public Libraries Acts were adopted on 7 December 1887 with the Hammersmith Library Commissioners appointed on 21 December. The first librarian was appointed on 15 January 1889 and the reading rooms at Ravenscourt Park were opened on 12 August 1889. The first public library at Ravenscourt Park was opened by John Lubbock, 1st Baron Avebury on 19 March 1890. A second public library, the Passmore Edwards Public Library at Shepherd's Bush, was opened by Archibald Primrose, 5th Earl of Rosebery on 25 June 1896. The powers and duties of the library commissioners were absorbed by the vestry on 29 September 1896. A reading room and delivery station was opened by the vestry at College Park on 22 April 1899.

=== Coat of arms ===
In March 1897, as a new town hall was nearing completion, the vestry resolved to seek a grant of arms form the College of Arms to display on the building. In July of the same year a draft memorial was received from the college, and payment of £76 10s made. The arms were officially granted in December, and inherited by the Hammersmith Borough Council in 1900.

=== Abolition ===
The London Government Act 1899 (62 & 63 Vict. c. 14) reformed the administration of London by dividing the County of London into 28 metropolitan boroughs, replacing the 42 local authorities administering the area. On 15 May 1900, the Metropolitan Borough of Hammersmith was created from the civil parish of Hammersmith, governed by Hammersmith Borough Council, abolishing the Hammersmith Vestry.
