= Hackney District (Metropolis) =

Hackney
- Board of works district
- History
  - Created: 1855
  - Abolished: 1894
  - Succeeded by: Hackney; Stoke Newington
- Status: Board of works district
- Government: Hackney District Board of Works

Hackney was a local government district within the metropolitan area of London, England from 1855 to 1894. It was formed by the Metropolis Management Act 1855 and was governed by the Hackney District Board of Works, which consisted of elected vestrymen. It was in the part of the county of Middlesex that was within the area of the Metropolitan Board of Works. In 1889 it became part of the County of London and the district board functioned as a local authority under the London County Council.

== Area ==
The district comprised the civil parishes of Hackney and Stoke Newington.

Under the Metropolis Management Act 1855 any parish that exceeded 2,000 ratepayers was to be divided into wards; as such the parish of St John at Hackney within the Hackney District Boards of Works was divided into seven wards (electing vestrymen): No. 1 or Stamford Hill (15), No. 2 or West (18), No. 3 or De Beauvoir Town (18), No. 4 or Dalston (18), No. 5 or Hackney (18), No. 6 or Homerton (15) and No. 7 or South (18).

In 1891 as its population had increased the parish of St Mary Stoke Newington was divided into five wards (electing vestrymen): Lordship (15), Church (15), Manor (12), Clissold (9) and Palatine (9).

== Abolition ==
The district was abolished in 1894 with the vestry of each parish taking on local administration. Each parish would go on to form a metropolitan borough in the County of London in 1900. These two were merged with Shoreditch in 1965 to form the London Borough of Hackney.
