= Limehouse District (Metropolis) =

Limehouse
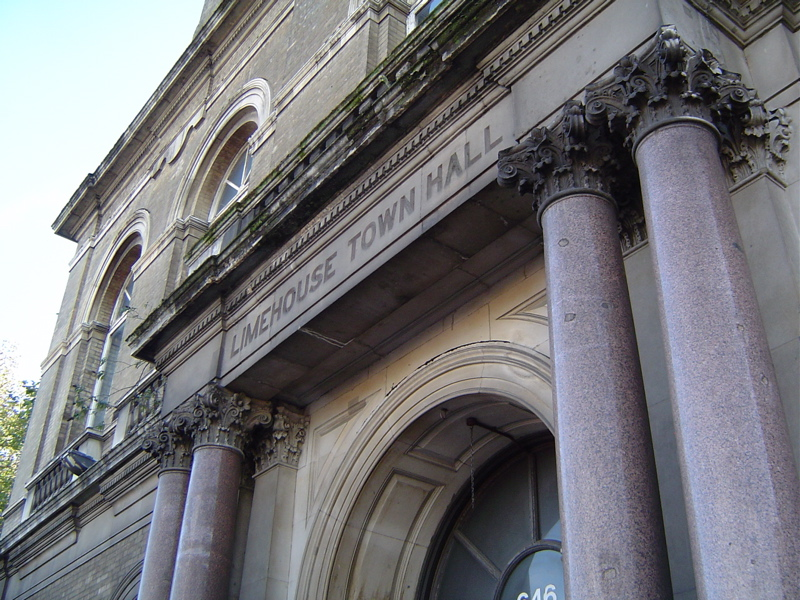
- Limehouse Town Hall

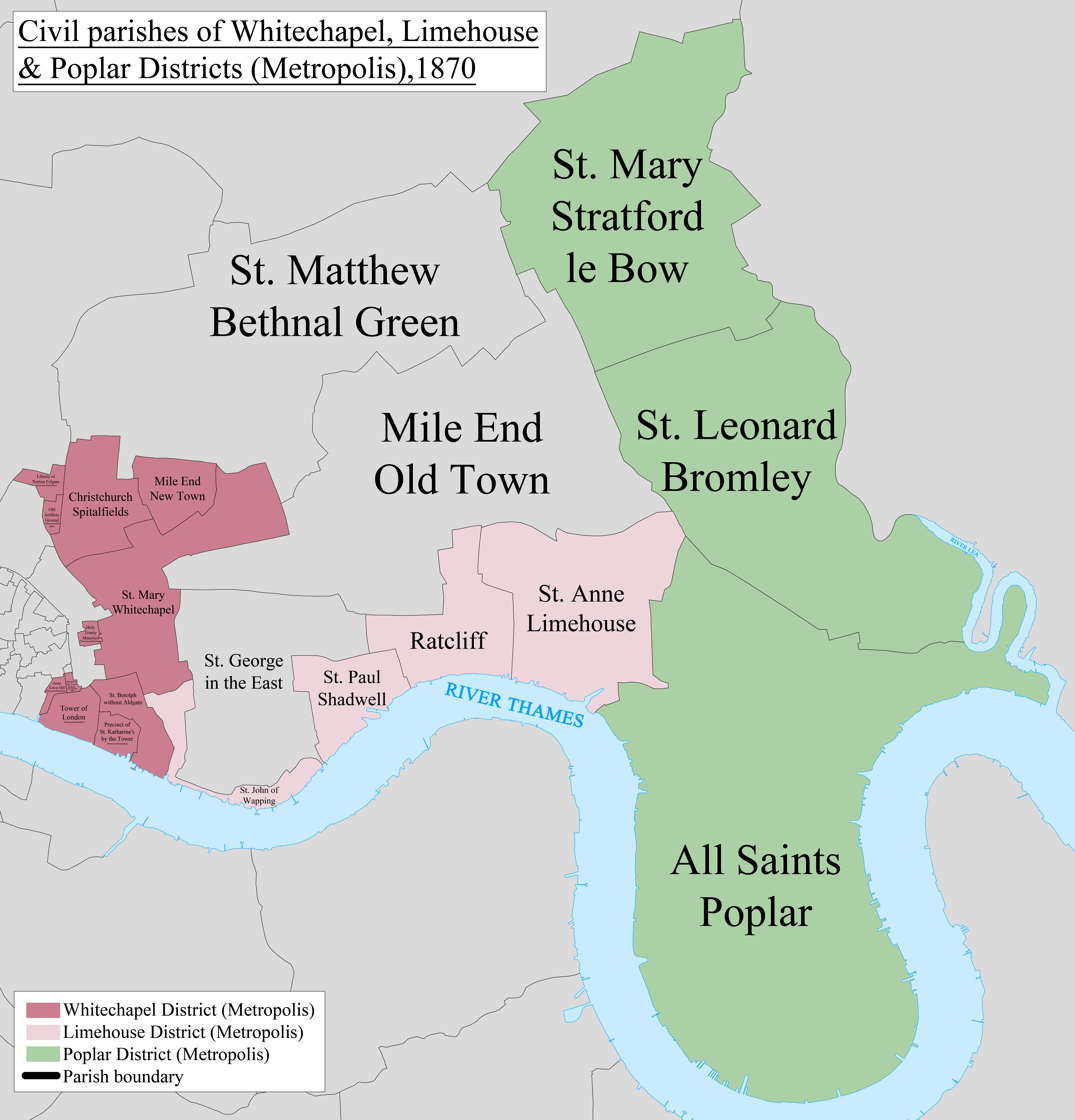
- History
  - Created: 1855
  - Abolished: 1900
  - Succeeded by: Metropolitan Borough of Stepney
- Status: District
- Government: Limehouse District Board of Works
  - HQ: White Horse Street (1855—1878); Commercial Road (1878—1900)

Limehouse was a local government district within the metropolitan area of London, England from 1855 to 1900.

== History ==
It was formed by the Metropolis Management Act 1855 and was governed by the Limehouse District Board of Works, which consisted of elected vestrymen.

Until 1889 the district was in the county of Middlesex, but included in the area of the Metropolitan Board of Works. In 1889 the area of the MBW was constituted the County of London, and the district board became a local authority under the London County Council.

== Area ==
The district comprised the following civil parishes:

- St Anne Limehouse
- Hamlet of Ratcliff within the parish of St Dunstan Stepney
- St Paul Shadwell
- St John of Wapping (an exclave separated by a narrow strip of St George in the East)

Under the Metropolis Management Act 1855 any parish that exceeded 2,000 ratepayers was to be divided into wards; however the parishes of Limehouse District Board of Works did not exceed this number so were not divided into wards.

In 1894 the population had increased enough for the parish of St Anne Limehouse to be divided into three wards (electing vestrymen): South (18), North (21) and East (21).

== Abolition ==
The district was abolished in 1900 and became part of the Metropolitan Borough of Stepney.
