= 1931 Bermondsey Borough Council election =

Local election in England

Elections to the Metropolitan Borough of Bermondsey were held in 1931.

The borough had 12 wards which returned between 3 and 6 members. Of the 12 wards 1 of the wards had all candidates elected unopposed.

== Election result ==
Bermondsey Borough Election Result 1931
Party	Seats	Gains	Losses	Net gain/loss	Seats %	Votes %	Votes	+/−
Labour	45							–
Electoral Alliance	9							
Communist	0				0.0			
Progressive	0				0.0			

Preceded by 1928 Bermondsey Borough election	Southwark local elections	Succeeded by 1934 Bermondsey Borough election
