= Lee District (Metropolis) =

Lee (1894—1900) Plumstead (1855—1894)
- History
  - Created: 1855
  - Abolished: 1900
  - Succeeded by: Metropolitan Borough of Greenwich; Metropolitan Borough of Lewisham; Metropolitan Borough of Woolwich
- Status: District
- Government: Plumstead District Board of Works (1855—1894); Lee District Board of Works (1894—1900)

Plumstead (1855–1894) and then Lee (1894–1900) was a local government district within the metropolitan area of London from 1855 to 1900. It was formed as the Plumstead district by the Metropolis Management Act 1855 and was governed by the Plumstead District Board of Works, which consisted of elected vestrymen.

In 1889 the area of the MBW was constituted the County of London, and the District Board became a local authority under the London County Council. In 1894 the parish of Plumstead was removed from the district to be governed by a parish vestry and the district was renamed Lee.

== Area ==
The district comprised the following civil parishes:

- Charlton next Woolwich
- Eltham
- Kidbrooke
- Lee
- Plumstead (1855–1894)

Under the Metropolis Management Act 1855 any parish that exceeded 2,000 ratepayers was to be divided into wards; however the parishes of Plumstead District Board of Works did not exceed this number so were not divided into wards.

In 1889-90 the population had increased enough for the parish of Plumstead to be divided into eight wards (electing vestrymen): North (9), North East (12), North West (9), West (12), South West (15), South East (15), East (12) and South (12).

In 1891-92 the population had increased enough for the parish of Lee to be divided into four wards (electing vestrymen): Church (9), Park (6), Manor (12) and South (9).

== Abolition ==
The district was abolished in 1900 and split as follows:

- Charlton next Woolwich and Kidbrooke to Metropolitan Borough of Greenwich
- Eltham to Metropolitan Borough of Woolwich
- Lee to Metropolitan Borough of Lewisham
