= List of London vestries and district boards =

This is a list of local authorities in London, England, from 1855 to 1900. There were some changes to their number between 1886 and 1894. Following the changes there were 42 authorities responsible for local government, made up of 29 administrative vestries, 12 district boards and one local board of health.

== Administrative vestries and district boards ==
The following were the local authorities incorporated by the Metropolis Management Act 1855 (18 & 19 Vict. c. 120). They functioned from 1855 to 1900, unless otherwise stated. The administrative vestries were delineated as the Schedule A vestries in the Metropolis Management Act 1855. The district boards and administrative vestries had identical powers, but different methods of election. The administrative vestries were directly elected and the district boards were appointed by non-administrative vestries. The equivalent body for the City of London at this time was the Commissioners of Sewers.

=== 1855 incorporations ===
- Bermondsey Vestry
- Bethnal Green Vestry
- Camberwell Vestry
- Chelsea Vestry
- Clerkenwell Vestry
- Fulham District Board of Works (dissolved 1886)
- Greenwich District Board of Works
- Hackney District Board of Works (dissolved 1894)
- Hampstead Vestry
- Holborn District Board of Works
- Islington Vestry
- Kensington Vestry
- Lambeth Vestry
- Lewisham District Board of Works
- Limehouse District Board of Works
- Mile End Old Town Vestry
- Newington Vestry
- Paddington Vestry
- Plumstead District Board of Works (dissolved 1894)
- Poplar District Board of Works
- Rotherhithe Vestry
- St George Hanover Square Vestry
- St George in the East Vestry
- St Giles District Board of Works
- St Luke's Vestry
- St Martin in the Fields Vestry
- St Marylebone Vestry
- St Olave District Board of Works
- St Pancras Vestry
- St Saviour's District Board of Works
- Shoreditch Vestry
- Southwark St George the Martyr Vestry
- Strand District Board of Works
- Wandsworth District Board of Works
- Westminster District Board of Works (dissolved 1887)
- Westminster St James Vestry
- Whitechapel District Board of Works
- Woolwich Local Board of Health

=== Later incorporations ===
The following became administrative vestries or district boards as shown.

- Battersea Vestry (1888)
- Fulham Vestry (1886)
- Hackney Vestry (1894)
- Hammersmith Vestry (1886)
- Lee District Board of Works (1894)
- Plumstead Vestry (1894)
- Stoke Newington Vestry (1894)
- Westminster St Margaret and St John Vestry (1887)

== Non-administrative vestries ==
The following were non-administrative vestries. They had very limited functions, (Note: They could, for example, continue to use the powers of the Burial Act 1852 to set up a burial board.) with their main purpose to appoint members to the district boards of works. They were delineated as the Schedule B vestries in the Metropolis Management Act 1855 and were also known as the smaller vestries. There were 55 non-administrative vestries in 1855 and their number had reduced to 47 in 1894 as some had been upgraded to administrate vestries.

- Battersea (until 1888)
- Bow
- Bromley
- Charlton
- Clapham
- Deptford St Nicholas
- Deptford St Paul
- Eltham
- Fulham (until 1886)
- Glasshouse Yard
- Greenwich
- Hackney (until 1894)
- Hammersmith (until 1886)
- Kidbrooke
- Lee
- Lewisham
- Limehouse
- Mile End New Town
- Minories
- Norton Folgate
- Old Artillery Ground
- Penge
- Plumstead (until 1894)
- Poplar
- Putney
- Ratcliff
- Rolls
- Saffron Hill, Hatton Garden, Ely Rents, and Ely Place
- St Botolph without Aldgate
- St Andrew Holborn Above the Bars with St George the Martyr
- St Clement Danes
- St Giles in the Fields
- St George Bloomsbury
- St Katherine (Note: Abolished in 1895 to became part of St Botolph without Aldgate)
- St Mary le Strand
- St Paul Covent Garden
- St Sepulchre
- Savoy
- Shadwell
- Southwark St John Horsleydown
- Southwark St Olave (Note: Merged in 1896 to form Southwark St Olave and St Thomas)
- Southwark St Thomas
- Southwark Christchurch
- Southwark St Saviour
- Spitalfields
- Stoke Newington (until 1894)
- Streatham
- Tooting Graveney
- Tower
- Wandsworth
- Wapping
- Westminster St Anne
- Westminster St Margaret (until 1887)
- Westminster St John (until 1887)
- Whitechapel
