= 1934 Bermondsey Borough Council election =

Local election in England

Elections to the Metropolitan Borough of Bermondsey were held in 1934.

The borough had 12 wards which returned between 3 and 6 members. Of the 12 wards 1 of the wards had all candidates elected unopposed. Labour won all the seats.

== Election result ==
Bermondsey Borough Election Result 1934
Party	Seats	Gains	Losses	Net gain/loss	Seats %	Votes %	Votes	+/−
Labour	54				100.0			
Municipal Reform	0				0.0			
Independent Ratepayer's Association	0				0.0			
Electoral Alliance	0				0.0			
Communist	0				0.0			

Preceded by 1931 Bermondsey Borough election	Southwark local elections	Succeeded by 1937 Bermondsey Borough election
