= Lewisham District (Metropolis) =

Lewisham
- History
  - Created: 1855
  - Abolished: 1900
  - Succeeded by: Metropolitan Borough of Lewisham; Penge Urban District
- Status: District
- Government: Lewisham District Board of Works
  - HQ: Catford Road

Lewisham was a local government district within the metropolitan area of London, England from 1855 to 1900. It was formed by the Metropolis Management Act 1855 and was governed by the Lewisham District Board of Works, which consisted of elected vestrymen.

Until 1889 the district was partly in the counties of Kent and Surrey, but included in the area of the Metropolitan Board of Works. In 1889 the area of the MBW was constituted the County of London, and the district board became a local authority under the London County Council.

== Area ==
The district comprised the following civil parishes:

- Lewisham (Kent)
- Penge (Surrey)

Under the Metropolis Management Act 1855 any parish that exceeded 2,000 ratepayers was to be divided into wards; as such the parish of Lewisham within the Lewisham District Board of Works was divided into three wards (electing vestrymen): No. 1 or Blackheath (9), No. 2 or Sydenham (12) and No. 3 or Lewisham (15).

== Abolition ==
The district was abolished in 1900 and split as follows:

- Lewisham to Metropolitan Borough of Lewisham
- Penge to Penge Urban District (transferred to Kent)
