= Metropolis Management Act 1855 =

Act of the Parliament of the United Kingdom

Metropolis Management Act 1855 (Note: The citation of this act by this short title was authorised by section 1 of, and the first schedule to, the Short Titles Act 1896 (59 & 60 Vict. c. 14), section 1 and the first schedule. Due to the repeal of those provisions it is now authorised by section 19(2) of the Interpretation Act 1978.)
- Act of Parliament
- Parliament of the United Kingdom
- Long title: An Act for the better Local Management of the Metropolis
- Citation: 18 & 19 Vict. c. 120
- Territorial extent: United Kingdom

Dates
- Royal assent: 14 August 1855
- Commencement: 1 January 1856 (Note: Section 251.)
Other legislation
Amended by	Metropolis Management Amendment Act 1856; Metropolis Management Amendment Act 1858; Metropolis Management Amendment Act 1862; Statute Law Revision Act 1875; Metropolis Management and Building Acts Amendment Act 1878; Summary Jurisdiction Act 1884; Metropolis Management Amendment Act 1885; Public Health (London) Act 1891; Statute Law Revision Act 1892; Local Government Act 1894; Public Health (London) Act 1936; London Government Act 1939; Statute Law Revision Act 1950; Charities Act 1960; Local Law (Greater London Council and Inner London Boroughs) Order 1965
Relates to	Factory and Workshop Act 1883

Status: Partially repealed

Text of statute as originally enacted

Revised text of statute as amended

Text of the Metropolis Management Act 1855 as in force today (including any amendments) within the United Kingdom, from legislation.gov.uk.

The Metropolis Management Act 1855 (18 & 19 Vict. c. 120), also known as the Metropolis (Management) Act 1855 or the Metropolis Local Management Act 1855, is an act of the Parliament of the United Kingdom that created the Metropolitan Board of Works, a London-wide body to co-ordinate the construction of the city's infrastructure. The act also created a second tier of local government consisting of parish vestries and district boards of works. The Metropolitan Board of Works was the forerunner of the London County Council.

== Background ==
The Royal Commission on the City of London considered the case for creation of an authority for the whole of London. Its report recommended the creation of a limited-function Metropolitan Board of Works and seven municipal corporations based on existing parliamentary representation.

== Provisions ==
=== The Metropolitan Board of Works ===
The act constituted the Metropolitan Board of Works and provided that its members should be chosen by the parish vestries and district boards also constituted by the act. The first election of members was to take place on 12 December 1855. From 1857, one third of the board was to go out of office on the third Wednesday of June every year. The board took over the powers, duties and liabilities of the Metropolitan Commission of Sewers and the Metropolitan Buildings Office. Its area of responsibility was to be that designated by the Registrar General as "London" in the 1851 census.

=== Vestries and district boards ===
The second tier of local government was to be based on the existing vestries of civil parishes in an area comprising parts of the counties of Middlesex, Kent and Surrey. Larger areas were allowed to elect specific vestries, and smaller areas were represented by appointed district boards.

== List of vestries, district boards and number of members elected to the Metropolitan Board of Works ==
Vestries and districts of the Metropolis 1855
1. City of London; 2. Bermondsey; 3. Bethnal Green; 4. Camberwell; 5. (and 5a) Chelsea; 6. Clerkenwell; 7. Fulham District; 8. Greenwich District; 9. Hackney District; 10. Hampstead; 11. Holborn District; 12. Islington; 13. Kensington; 14. Lambeth; 15. (and 15a) Lewisham District; 16. Limehouse District; 17. Mile End Old Town; 18. Newington; 19. Paddington; 20. Plumstead District; 21. Poplar District; 22. Rotherhithe; 23. St George Hanover Square; 24. St George in the East; 25. St Giles District; 26. St Luke; 27. St Martin the Fields; 28. St Marylebone; 29. St Olave District; 30. St Pancras; 31. St Saviours District; 32. Shoreditch; 33. Southwark St George the Martyr; 34. (and 34a) Strand District; 35. (and 35a) Wandsworth District; 36. (and 36a) Westminster District; 37. Westminster St James; 38. Whitechapel District; 39. Woolwich
The following were detached parts of parishes and districts: 5a Kensal Green; 15a Penge Hamlet; 34a St Anne; 35a detached portion of Streatham parish; 36a Kensington Gardens Not shown is Clerkenwell Detached, an exclave of that parish within Hornsey, Middlesex.

Electing authority	Number of members elected to MBW	Administrative headquarters
City of London	3	Guildhall
Bermondsey Vestry (Surrey)	1	Town Hall, Spa Road, Bermondsey
Bethnal Green Vestry (Middlesex)	1	Vestry Hall, Bethnal Green
Camberwell Vestry (Surrey)	1	Vestry Hall, Peckham Road
Chelsea Vestry (Middlesex)	1	Town Hall, King's Road, Chelsea
St. James & St. John Clerkenwell Vestry (Middlesex)	1	Vestry Hall, 58 Rosomon Street, Clerkenwell (replaced by Town Hall in Rosebery Avenue 1895)
Fulham District, comprising: Fulham (Middlesex); Hammersmith (Middlesex)	1	Town Hall, Walham Green
Greenwich District, comprising: Deptford St. Nicholas (Kent); Deptford St. Paul (Kent and Surrey); Greenwich (Kent)	1	141 Greenwich Road, Greenwich
Hackney District, comprising: Hackney (Middlesex); Stoke Newington (Middlesex)	1	Town Hall, Hackney
Hampstead Vestry (Middlesex)	1	Vestry Hall, Haverstock Hill, Hampstead
Holborn District, comprising: Liberty of Glasshouse Yard (Middlesex); Liberty of Saffron Hill, Hatton Garden, Ely Rents and Ely Place (Middlesex); St Andrew Holborn Above the Bars with St George the Martyr (Middlesex); St Sepulchre (Middlesex)	1	Town Hall, Gray's Inn Road
Islington St Mary Vestry (Middlesex)	2	Vestry Hall, Upper Street, Islington
Kensington Vestry (Middlesex)	1	Town Hall, Kensington
Lambeth Vestry (Surrey)	2	Vestry Hall, Kennington Green
Lewisham District comprising: Lewisham (Kent); Sydenham Chapelry (Kent); Penge Township (Surrey)	1 member jointly with Plumstead District	Catford
Limehouse District comprising: Limehouse (Middlesex); Ratcliff (Middlesex); Shadwell (Middlesex); Wapping (Middlesex)	1	White Horse Street, Commercial Road
Hamlet of Mile End Old Town Vestry (Middlesex)	1	Vestry Hall, Bancroft Road, Mile End Road
Newington Vestry (Surrey)	1	Vestry Hall, Walworth Road
Paddington Vestry (Middlesex)	1	Vestry Hall, Harrow Road
Plumstead District comprising: Charlton-next-Woolwich (Kent); Eltham (Kent); Kidbrooke (Kent); Lee (Kent); Plumstead (Kent)	1 member jointly with Lewisham District	Old Charlton
Poplar District comprising: Bow (Middlesex); Bromley (Middlesex); Poplar (Middlesex)	1	117 High Street, Poplar
Rotherhithe Vestry (Surrey)	1 member jointly with St Olave District	Public Baths, Lower Road, Rotherhithe
St George Hanover Square Vestry (Middlesex)	2	Vestry Hall, Mount Street, Grosvenor Square
St George in the East Vestry (Middlesex)	1	Vestry Hall, Cable Street
St Giles District comprising: St Giles in the Fields (Middlesex); St George's Bloomsbury (Middlesex)	1	197 High Holborn
St Luke Middlesex Vestry (Middlesex)	1	Vestry Hall, City Road (extraterritorially in Shoreditch St Leonard)
St Martin in the Fields Vestry (Middlesex)	1	Town Hall, Charing Cross Road
St Marylebone Vestry (Middlesex)	2	Court House, Marylebone Lane
St Olave District comprising: Southwark St John Horsleydown (Surrey); Southwark St Olave (Surrey); Southwark St Thomas (Surrey)	1 member jointly with Rotherhithe Vestry	Vine Street, Tooley Street, Southwark
St Pancras Vestry (Middlesex)	2	Vestry Hall, Pancras Road
St Saviour's District comprising: Southwark Christchurch (Surrey); Southwark St Saviour (Surrey)	1	3 Emerson Street, Bankside
Shoreditch St Leonard Vestry (Middlesex)	2	Shoreditch Town Hall, Old Street
Southwark St George the Martyr Vestry (Surrey)	1	Vestry Hall, 81 Borough Road
Strand District comprising: Liberty of the Rolls (Middlesex); St Anne Within the Liberty of Westminster (Middlesex); St Clement Danes (Middlesex); St Mary le Strand (Middlesex); St Paul Covent Garden (Middlesex); Precinct of the Savoy (Middlesex)	1	5 Tavistock Street
Wandsworth District comprising: Battersea (Surrey); Clapham (Surrey); Putney (Surrey); Streatham (Surrey); Tooting Graveney (Surrey); Wandsworth (Surrey)	1	East Hill, Wandsworth
Westminster District comprising: Westminster St Margaret and St John (Middlesex)	1	Town Hall, Caxton Street, Westminster
Westminster St James Vestry (Middlesex)	1	Vestry Hall, Piccadilly
Whitechapel District comprising: Mile End New Town (Middlesex); Liberty of Norton Folgate (Middlesex); Old Artillery Ground (Middlesex); St Botolph without Aldgate (Middlesex); Spitalfields (Middlesex); Whitechapel (Middlesex)	1	15 Great Alie Street, Whitechapel
Woolwich Local Board (Kent)	1	Town Hall, Woolwich

A number of extra-parochial places lay within the Metropolitan Board of Works' area but were not included in any district:

- Inner Temple
- Middle Temple
- London Charterhouse
- Close of the Collegiate Church of St Peter (i.e. Westminster Abbey)
- Furnival's Inn
- Gray's Inn
- Lincoln's Inn
- Staple Inn

== Changes in later legislation ==
On 25 March 1886, following the passing of the Metropolis Management Amendment Act 1885 (48 & 49 Vict. c. 33), the Fulham District Board of Works was dissolved and vestries of Hammersmith and Fulham were incorporated, with elections to the Metropolitan Board of Works to be held on that date. Fulham Vestry continued to use the existing town hall at Walham Green, while Hammersmith Vestry built a town hall at Hammersmith Broadway.

In 1889, the Local Government Act 1888 (51 & 52 Vict. c. 41) replaced the Metropolitan Board of Works with the London County Council, and the area of the board became the County of London. From that date, the various parishes were separated from Middlesex, Kent and Surrey and placed for all purposes in the new county, while the vestries and district boards continued to function under the aegis of the new county council.

In 1894, the Hackney District Board of Works was dissolved, with the vestries of Hackney and Stoke Newington assuming the powers of the district board. Stoke Newington Vestry built a town hall at 126 Church Street. At the same time, the Vestry of the Parish of Plumstead became a separate authority, with the remaining four parishes of Plumstead District being reconstituted as Lee District Board of Works.

In 1896, the parishes of Southwark St Olave and St Thomas were combined as a civil parish.

In 1900, the London Government Act 1899 (62 & 63 Vict. c. 14) replaced vestries and district boards with metropolitan boroughs.

== Subsequent developments ==
Sections 213 and 214 of the act were repealed by section 1(1) of, and the first schedule to, the Statute Law Revision Act 1950 (14 Geo. 6. c. 6), which came into force on 23 May 1950.

As of March 2025, the majority of the act has been repealed with only sections 239 and 240 remaining in force. Section 239 deals with the maintenance of enclosed gardens and section 240 relates to obligations under the Crown Estate Paving Act 1851 (14 & 15 Vict. c. 95).

== Bibliography ==
- Metropolis Local Management Bill, Hansard
- Scott, James John (1855). Metropolis Local Management Act. ... With notes: together with the portions of the Metropolitan Buildings Act, conferring extra powers on the Metropolitan Board of Works, etc. London: Knight & Co.
