= Metropolitan Borough of Hammersmith =

Metropolitan borough of the County of London

Hammersmith Metropolitan Borough of Hammersmith
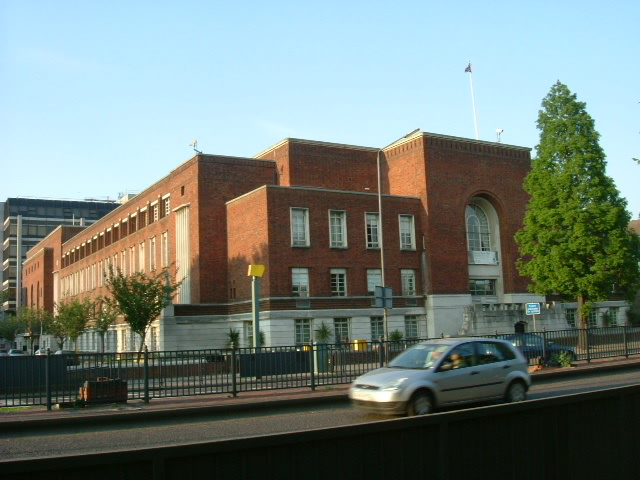
- Hammersmith Town Hall, built 1938 by E Berry Webber

- Coat of arms

- Hammersmith within London from 1900 to 1965
- Area
  - 1961: 2,288 acres
  - Coordinates: 51.4915°N 0.2341°W
- Population
  - 1841: 13,453
  - 1961: 110,333
- History
  - Created: 1900
  - Abolished: 1965
  - Succeeded by: London Borough of Hammersmith
- Government: Hammersmith Metropolitan Borough Council
  - Type: Metropolitan borough
  - HQ: Hammersmith Town Hall, King Street
  - Motto: Spectemur Agendo (Let us be judged by our actions)
Preceded by	Succeeded by
Hammersmith Vestry	London Borough of Hammersmith; London Borough of Hammersmith and Fulham
- Today part of: London Borough of Hammersmith and Fulham
- Map of borough boundary

The Metropolitan Borough of Hammersmith was a metropolitan borough in London, England from 1900 to 1965. It included Hammersmith, Wormwood Scrubs, Old Oak Common and Shepherd's Bush.

The borough was created in 1900 from the parish of Hammersmith, with the Hammersmith Metropolitan Borough Council replacing the Hammersmith Vestry.

In 1965, the borough was abolished and became the northern part of the London Borough of Hammersmith, later renamed to the London Borough of Hammersmith and Fulham in 1979.

== History ==
The London Government Act 1899 (62 & 63 Vict. c. 14) reformed the administration of London by dividing the County of London into 28 metropolitan boroughs, replacing the 41 parish vestries and district boards of works administering the area. Under the terms of the London Government Act 1899, each borough was to be governed by a borough council consisting of a mayor, aldermen and councillors.

On 13 March 1900, Drafts of Orders in Council were laid before both Houses of Parliament for the establishment and incorporation of the Metropolitan Borough of Hammersmith.

On 15 May 1900, by the "Borough of Hammersmith in Council, 1900" Order in Council, the Metropolitan Borough of Hammersmith was formed from the civil parish of Hammersmith, and the Hammersmith Metropolitan Borough Council (formally "The Mayor, Aldermen and Councillors of the Metropolitan Borough of Hammersmith") was established and incorporated as a body corporate, replacing the Hammersmith Vestry.

The London Government Act 1963 created Greater London, divided into 32 London boroughs, abolishing civil parishes in London. On 30 March 1965, The London Government Order 1965 was laid before the house, to effect the changes.

On 1 April 1965, the Metropolitan Borough of Hammersmith ceased to exist and merged with the Metropolitan Borough of Fulham to form the London Borough of Hammersmith. The Hammersmith Metropolitan Borough Council was succeeded by the Hammersmith London Borough Council.

On 22 November 1978, a specially convened meeting of the council was held to change the borough's name. Taking effect on 1 April 1979, the borough was renamed to the London Borough of Hammersmith and Fulham and the council was renamed to the Hammersmith and Fulham Borough Council.

== Coat of arms ==
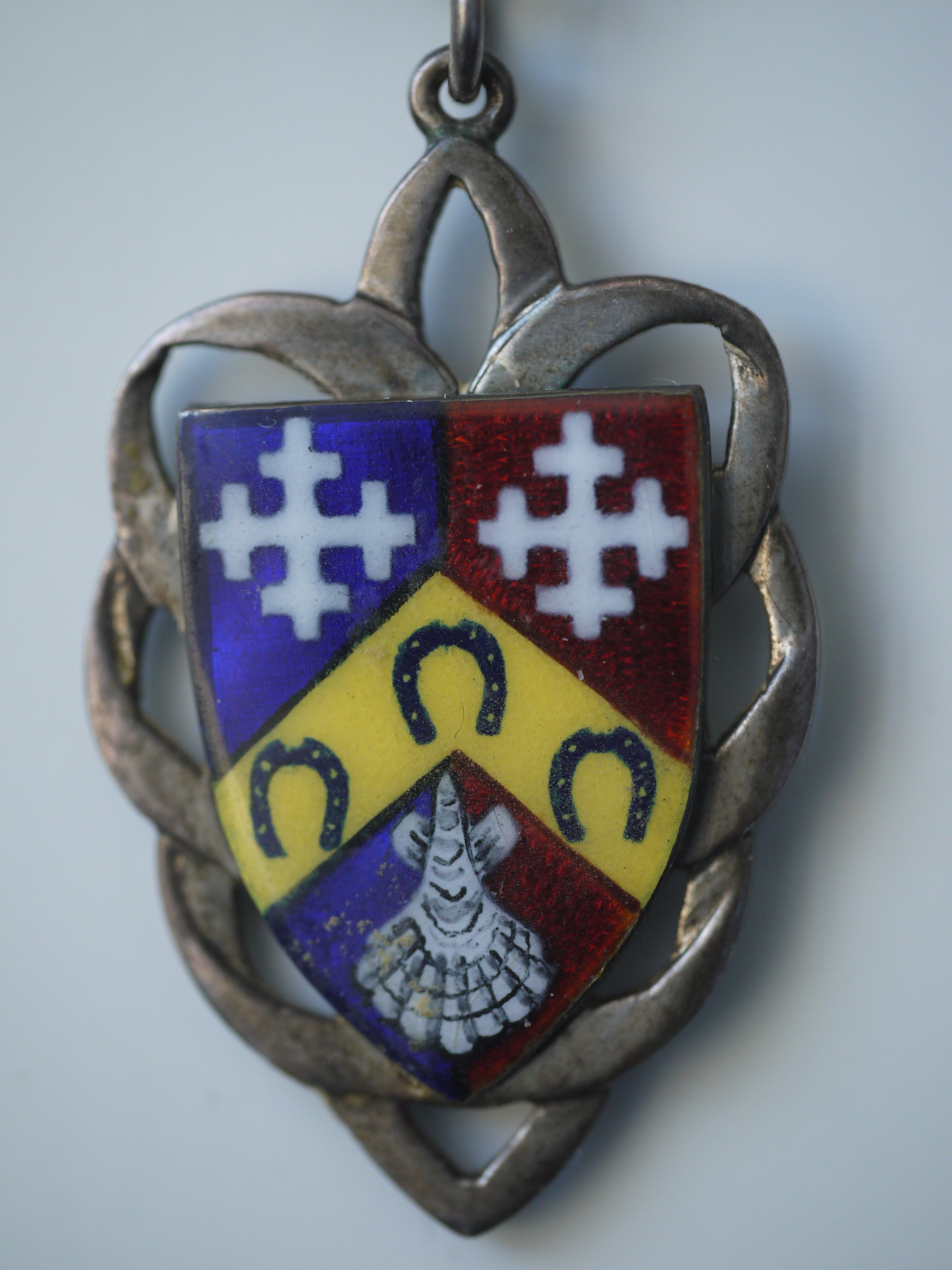
Deputy Mayoress medal

The coat of arms of the Metropolitan Borough of Hammersmith was granted to the predecessor Hammersmith Vestry on 23 December 1897. The division of the field was "Party per pale azure and gules, on a chevron between two cross crosslets in chief and an escallop in base argent, three horse-shoes of the first". The crest was "On a wreath of the colours, upon the battlements of a tower two hammers in saltire all proper". The motto was "Spectemur agendo", meaning "Let us be judged by our actions".

The cross crosslets come from the arms of Edward Latymer, who founded schools in Hammersmith in the seventeenth century which later evolved into Latymer Upper School and the Godolphin and Latymer School (both feature cross crosslets in their coats of arms). The horseshoes come from the arms of brickmaker Sir Nicholas Crispe, who introduced his technique into Hammersmith and who helped build a chapel, which was to become St Paul's, Hammersmith; and the scallop comes from the arms of George Pring, a surgeon who projected Hammersmith Bridge. The crest was a castle tower surmounted by two hammers, a pun on the name Hammersmith.

The new Hammersmith and Fulham London Borough Council retained the Metropolitan Borough's motto of Spectemur agendo, although it was spelled out in English ("Let us be judged by our acts") in the new coat of arms for the first few years.

== Population and area ==
The borough covered 2,286 acres (9.3 km^{2}). It included Hammersmith, Wormwood Scrubs, Old Oak Common and Shepherd's Bush.

The population in each census was:

Hammersmith Vestry 1801–1899

Year	1801	1811	1821	1831	1841	1851	1861	1871	1881	1891
Population	5,600	7,393	8,809	10,222	13,453	17,760	24,519	42,691	71,939	97,239

Metropolitan Borough 1900–1961

Year	1901	1911	1921	1931	1941	1951	1961
Population	112,239	121,521	130,295	135,523		119,367	110,333

== Politics ==
A map showing the wards of Hammersmith Metropolitan Borough as they appeared in 1916.

Under the Metropolis Management Act 1855 (18 & 19 Vict. c. 120) any parish that exceeded 2,000 ratepayers was to be divided into wards; however the parishes of Fulham District Board of Works did not exceed this number so were not divided into wards.

In 1873 the population had increased enough for the parish of Hammersmith to be divided into three wards (electing vestrymen): North (24), Centre (27) and South (21).

In 1894 as its population had increased the newly incorporated vestry was re-divided into six wards (electing vestrymen): No. 1 (12), No. 2 (18), No. 3 (15), No. 4 (15), No. 5 (6) and No. 6 (6).

The metropolitan borough was divided into seven wards for elections: No. 1, No. 2, No. 3, No. 4, No. 5, No. 6 and No. 7.

=== Parliament constituency ===
For elections to Parliament, the borough was represented by one constituency:

- Hammersmith

In 1918 the borough's representation was increased to two seats:

- Hammersmith North
- Hammersmith South

In 1955 the borough's representation was reduced to one and a half seats, when part of it was merged with Fulham:

- Barons Court
- Hammersmith North
