= Metropolitan boroughs of the County of London =

Former British administrative divisions

Metropolitan borough (London)
- Also known as: Borough
- Category: Local government district
- Location: England
- Found in: County of London
- Created by: London Government Act 1899
- Created: 1900
- Abolished by: London Government Act 1963
- Abolished: 1965
- Number: 28 (as of 1965)
- Possible status: City (1); Royal (1)
- Government: Borough Councils

Metropolitan boroughs were subdivisions of the County of London from 1900 to 1965. The 28 boroughs were created by the London Government Act 1899. In 1965 they were abolished and replaced by larger London boroughs within the new area of Greater London.

The City of London, indicated no. 1 on the map, was not a metropolitan borough. It predated the metropolitan boroughs and is still in existence.

== History ==
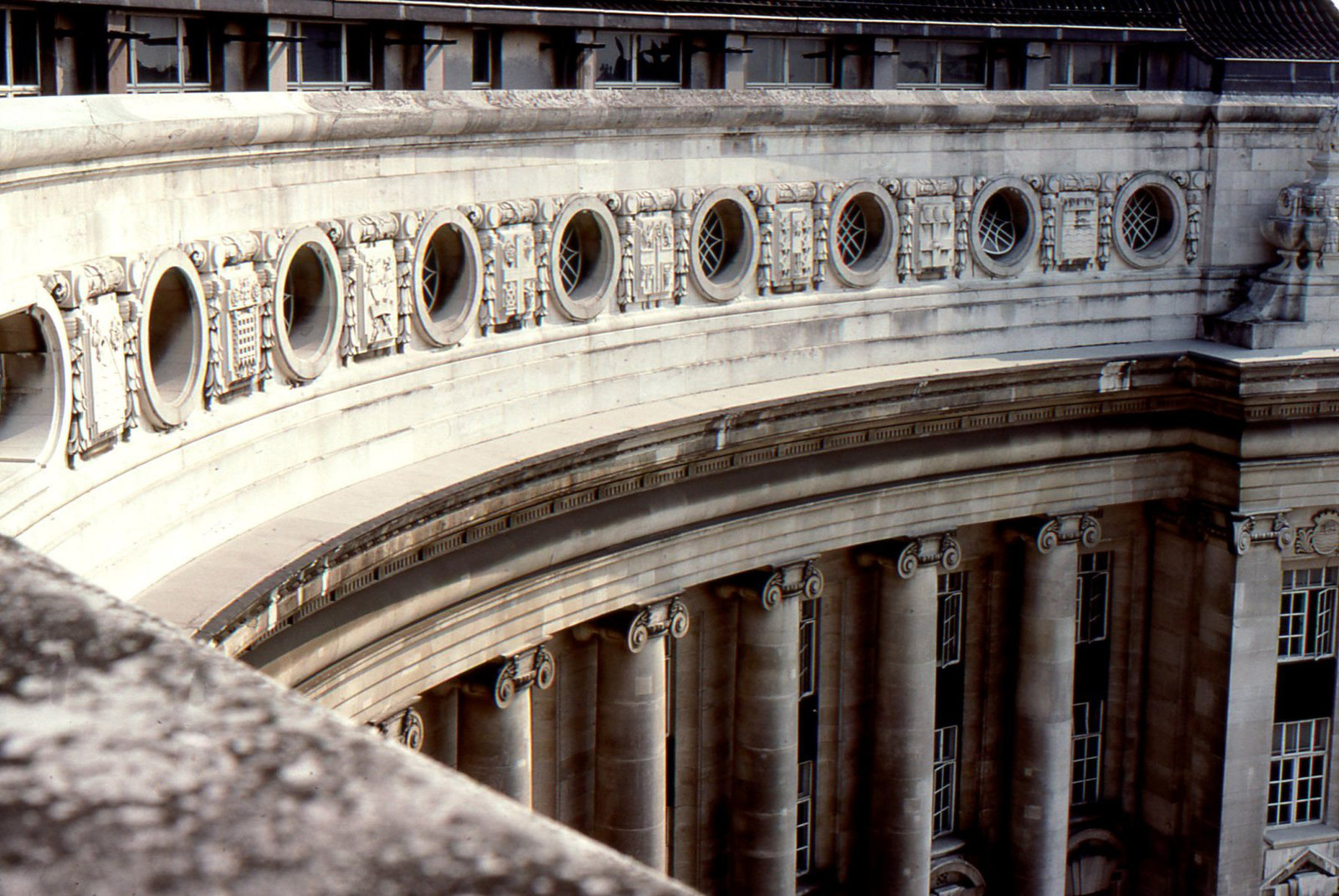
The coats of arms of some of the former metropolitan boroughs can still be seen in the façade of the old County Hall in London, although they are hard to see

Parliamentary boroughs covering the metropolitan area were created in 1832. They were Finsbury, Greenwich, Lambeth, Marylebone, Southwark, Tower Hamlets and Westminster. Soon after their creation it was proposed that they should be incorporated for local government purposes and this was also a finding of the Royal Commission on the City of London, but this did not happen.

The metropolitan boroughs were created in 1900 by the London Government Act 1899 which created 28 metropolitan boroughs as sub-divisions of the County of London. Their borough councils replaced vestry and district boards as the second tier of local government.

Some boroughs were formed as amalgamations of parishes, but most were continuations of existing units of local government, with the parish vestry or district board elevated to a borough council. With the creation of the boroughs, the opportunity was taken to correct a number of boundary anomalies. All civil parishes in the County of London continued to exist, although their role was reduced to administration of the New Poor Law and they were amalgamated over time to become aligned with the boroughs.

In 1965 the County of London was abolished by the London Government Act 1963 and replaced with the much larger Greater London. The 28 metropolitan boroughs were also abolished and merged to create 12 of the 32 larger London boroughs and are also known as Inner London boroughs.

== List of boroughs ==
Metropolitan Borough	Successor(s)	Population in 1961	Area in 1961	No. on map
Battersea	Wandsworth	105,870	2,164 acres (8.76 km^{2})	28
Bermondsey	Southwark	51,860	1,501 acres (6.07 km^{2})	8
Bethnal Green	Tower Hamlets	47,078	759 acres (3.07 km^{2})	6
Camberwell	Southwark	175,304	4,482 acres (18.14 km^{2})	10
Chelsea	Kensington and Chelsea	47,256	660 acres (2.7 km^{2})	29
Deptford	Lewisham	68,829	1,564 acres (6.33 km^{2})	11
Finsbury	Islington	32,887	586 acres (2.37 km^{2})	4
Fulham	Hammersmith	111,791	1,707 acres (6.91 km^{2})	25
Greenwich	Greenwich	85,546	3,864 acres (15.64 km^{2})	14
Hackney	Hackney	164,766	3,294 acres (13.33 km^{2})	16
Hammersmith	Hammersmith	110,333	2,288 acres (9.26 km^{2})	24
Hampstead	Camden	98,844	2,267 acres (9.17 km^{2})	20
Holborn	Camden	22,008	407 acres (1.65 km^{2})	3
Islington	Islington	228,345	3,092 acres (12.51 km^{2})	18
Kensington (Royal Borough)	Kensington and Chelsea	171,272	2,291 acres (9.27 km^{2})	23
Lambeth	Lambeth	223,763	4,089 acres (16.55 km^{2})	27
Lewisham	Lewisham	221,753	7,016 acres (28.39 km^{2})	12
Paddington	Westminster	116,923	1,355 acres (5.48 km^{2})	22
Poplar	Tower Hamlets	66,604	2,348 acres (9.50 km^{2})	15
Shoreditch	Hackney	40,455	659 acres (2.67 km^{2})	5
Southwark	Southwark	86,249	1,131 acres (4.58 km^{2})	9
St Marylebone	Westminster	69,045	1,472 acres (5.96 km^{2})	21
St Pancras	Camden	124,855	2,694 acres (10.90 km^{2})	19
Stepney	Tower Hamlets	92,000	1,771 acres (7.17 km^{2})	7
Stoke Newington	Hackney	52,301	865 acres (3.50 km^{2})	17
Wandsworth	Lambeth, Wandsworth	347,442	9,110 acres (36.9 km^{2})	26
Westminster (City)	Westminster	85,735	2,505 acres (10.14 km^{2})	2
Woolwich	Greenwich, Newham	146,603	8,281 acres (33.51 km^{2})	13

Interactive map of the metropolitan boroughs
