= Metropolitan Borough of Woolwich =

Borough of London, England

Coordinates: 51.4896°N 0.0647°E

Woolwich
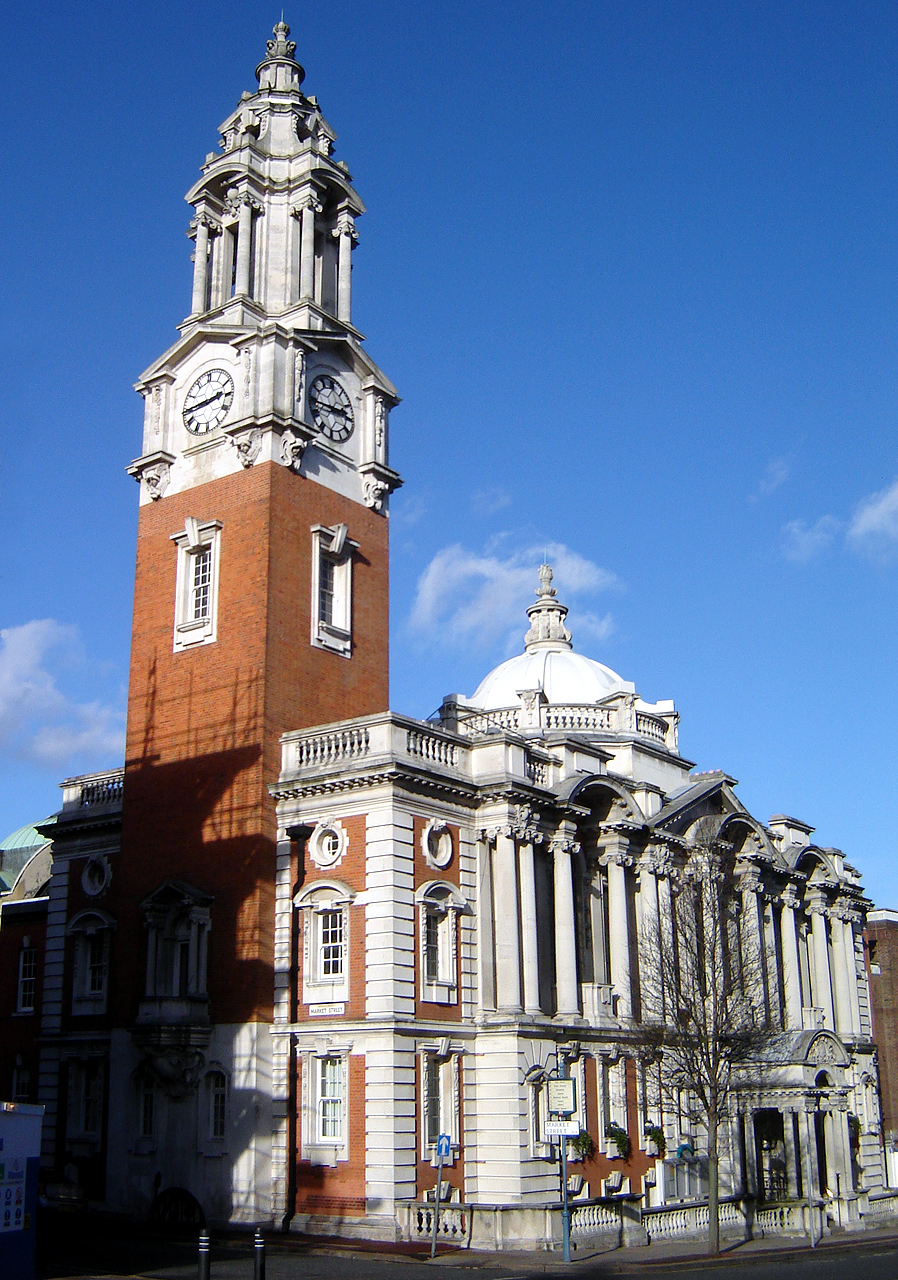
- Woolwich Town Hall

- Woolwich within the County of London
- History
  - Created: 1900
  - Abolished: 1965
  - Succeeded by: London Borough of Greenwich; London Borough of Newham
- Status: Metropolitan borough
- Government: Woolwich Borough Council
  - HQ: Wellington Street
  - Motto: Clamant nostra tela in Regis querela (Our weapons clash in the King's quarrel)
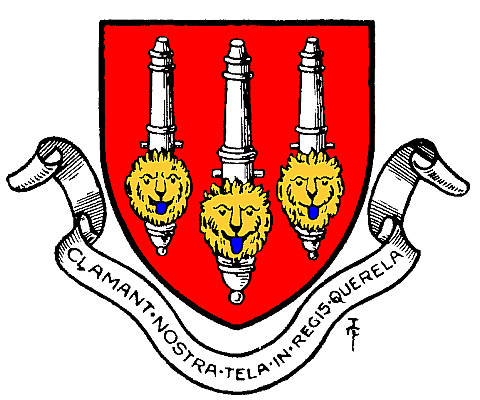
- Coat of arms of the borough council
- Map of borough boundary

The Metropolitan Borough of Woolwich was a metropolitan borough in the County of London from 1900 to 1965. It was formed from the civil parishes of Eltham, Plumstead and Woolwich. Its former area is now part of the Royal Borough of Greenwich and the London Borough of Newham.

== Formation and boundaries ==
The borough was formed from three civil parishes: Eltham, Plumstead and Woolwich. In 1930 these three were combined into a single civil parish called Borough of Woolwich, which was conterminous with the metropolitan borough.

Previous to the borough's formation it had been administered by three separate local bodies: Lee District Board of Works, Plumstead Vestry and Woolwich Local Board of Health.

== Population and area ==
The area of the borough varied between 8,277 and 8,282 acres (33.5 km^{2}). The population, as recorded at the census, was:

Constituent parishes 1801-1899

Year	1801	1811	1821	1831	1841	1851	1861	1871	1881	1891
Population	12,619	20,983	21,277	22,411	30,787	43,177	69,064	67,880	74,963	98,966

Metropolitan Borough 1900-1961

Year	1901	1911	1921	1931	1941	1951	1961
Population	117,178	121,376	140,389	146,881		147,891	146,603

== Politics ==
The borough was divided into eleven wards for elections: Burrage, Central, Dockyard, Eltham, Glyndon, Herbert, River, St George's, St Margaret's, St Mary's and St Nicholas.

=== Parliament constituency ===
For elections to Parliament, the borough was represented by one constituency:

- Woolwich

In 1918, the borough's representation was increased to two seats:

- Woolwich East
- Woolwich West

== Abolition ==
Most of it was amalgamated with the Metropolitan Borough of Greenwich to form the London Borough of Greenwich, but small parts north of the river, including North Woolwich, were instead included in the London Borough of Newham.
