= Metropolitan Borough of Lewisham =

Coordinates: 51.4452°N 0.0208°W

Lewisham
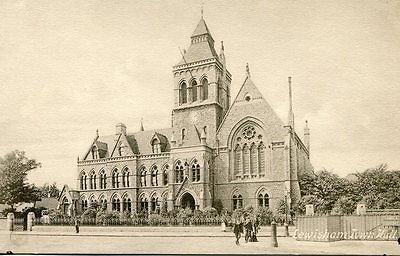
- The old Lewisham Vestry Hall

- Lewisham within the County of London
- Area
  - 1911: 7,014 acres (28 km^{2})
  - 1931: 7,015 acres (28 km^{2})
  - 1961: 7,016 acres (28 km^{2})
- Population
  - 1911: 160,834
  - 1931: 219,953
  - 1961: 221,753
- Density
  - 1911: 23/acre
  - 1931: 31/acre
  - 1961: 32/acre
- History
  - Created: 1900
  - Abolished: 1965
  - Succeeded by: London Borough of Lewisham
- Status: Metropolitan borough
- Government: Lewisham Borough Council
  - HQ: Town Hall, Catford
  - Motto: Salus Populi Suprema Lex (The welfare of the people is the highest law)
- Coat of arms of the borough council
- Map of borough boundary

The Metropolitan Borough of Lewisham was a metropolitan borough in the County of London between 1900 and 1965, when it became part of the London Borough of Lewisham along with the Metropolitan Borough of Deptford.

== History ==
The borough was formed by the London Government Act 1899 from the civil parishes of Lee from the Lee District and Lewisham from the Lewisham District. The borough also took in a small area formerly administered by Camberwell Vestry on the western slopes of Forest Hill.

While there had been minor industry along the River Ravensbourne for centuries and the extension of the railways had seen suburban development, there were still large areas of farmland at the time of the borough's formation. The next London property boom in the 1930s saw much of that farmland built upon with both private estates, and the final gaps on the roads to Kent were filled in later on with London County Council built social housing, particularly in Downham and Bellingham.

== Geography ==
The borough bordered Deptford, Greenwich, Camberwell, and had a portion of the southern boundary of the county of London.

Places in it included Lewisham, Blackheath, Lee, Hither Green, Catford, Brockley, Forest Hill and part of Sydenham.

== Population and area ==
The area of the borough was 7,015 acres (28.4 km^{2}). The population, as recorded at the census, was:

Constituent parishes 1801–1899

Year	1801	1811	1821	1831	1841	1851	1861	1871	1881	1891
Population	4,383	7,137	8,922	10,767	14,636	18,616	28,970	47,018	67,500	88,653

Metropolitan Borough 1900–1961

Year	1901	1911	1921	1931	1941	1951	1961
Population	127,495	160,834	174,194	219,953		227,576	221,753

== Coat of arms ==
Unofficial arms adopted in 1901

When the borough was created in 1900, a committee was appointed to design a coat of arms. This device, adopted in the following year, included a shield, crest, supporters and motto.

The shield had four quarters. The first quarter had the attributed arms of King Alfred, first lord of the manor. The second quarter showed a white on red horse, the arms associated with Kent. The Lewisham area was part of Kent until 1889. The third quarter showed a buck's head, from the arms of the Earl of Dartmouth, lord of the manor of Lewisham in 1901. The fourth quarter featured a bear's head and fesse or horizontal band, from the arms of Lord Northbrook, lord of the manor of Lee in 1901.

The crest was a raven, representing the Ravensbourne river.

The supporters were a silver buck sprinkled with red stars and a bear with a gold portcullis on his shoulder. These were also derived from the arms of the Earl of Dartmouth and Lord Northbrook respectively.

The Latin motto was Salus Populi Suprema Lex, or "the welfare of the people is the highest law" - a motto common to many English municipalities.

In 1950, in celebration of the borough's golden jubilee, a grant of arms was obtained from the College of Arms.

The shield was greatly simplified: A Saxon crown and golden lion recalled the association of King Alfred with the area. The background of three colours recalled the three main areas of the borough: green for Lee Green, purple for Hither (or heather) Green and black for Blackheath.

The raven crest was retained, with the addition of a silver and blue wave for the Ravensbourne.

The 1901 supporters were altered to make them unique to the borough. Around their necks were placed mural crowns, representative of local government.

The motto was not changed, and was continued in use by the London Borough of Lewisham in 1965.

== Politics ==
A map showing the wards of Lewisham Metropolitan Borough as they appeared in 1916.

The borough was divided into ten wards for elections: Blackheath, Brockley, Catford, Church, Forest Hill, Lewisham Park, Lewisham Village, Manor, South and Sydenham.

=== Parliament constituency ===
For elections to Parliament, the borough was represented by one constituency:

- Lewisham

In 1918 the borough's representation was increased to two seats:

- Lewisham East
- Lewisham West

In 1950 the borough's representation was increased to three seats:

- Lewisham North
- Lewisham South
- Lewisham West
