= Metropolitan Borough of St Marylebone =

Metropolitan borough of England

Coordinates: 51.5213°N 0.1601°W

St Marylebone
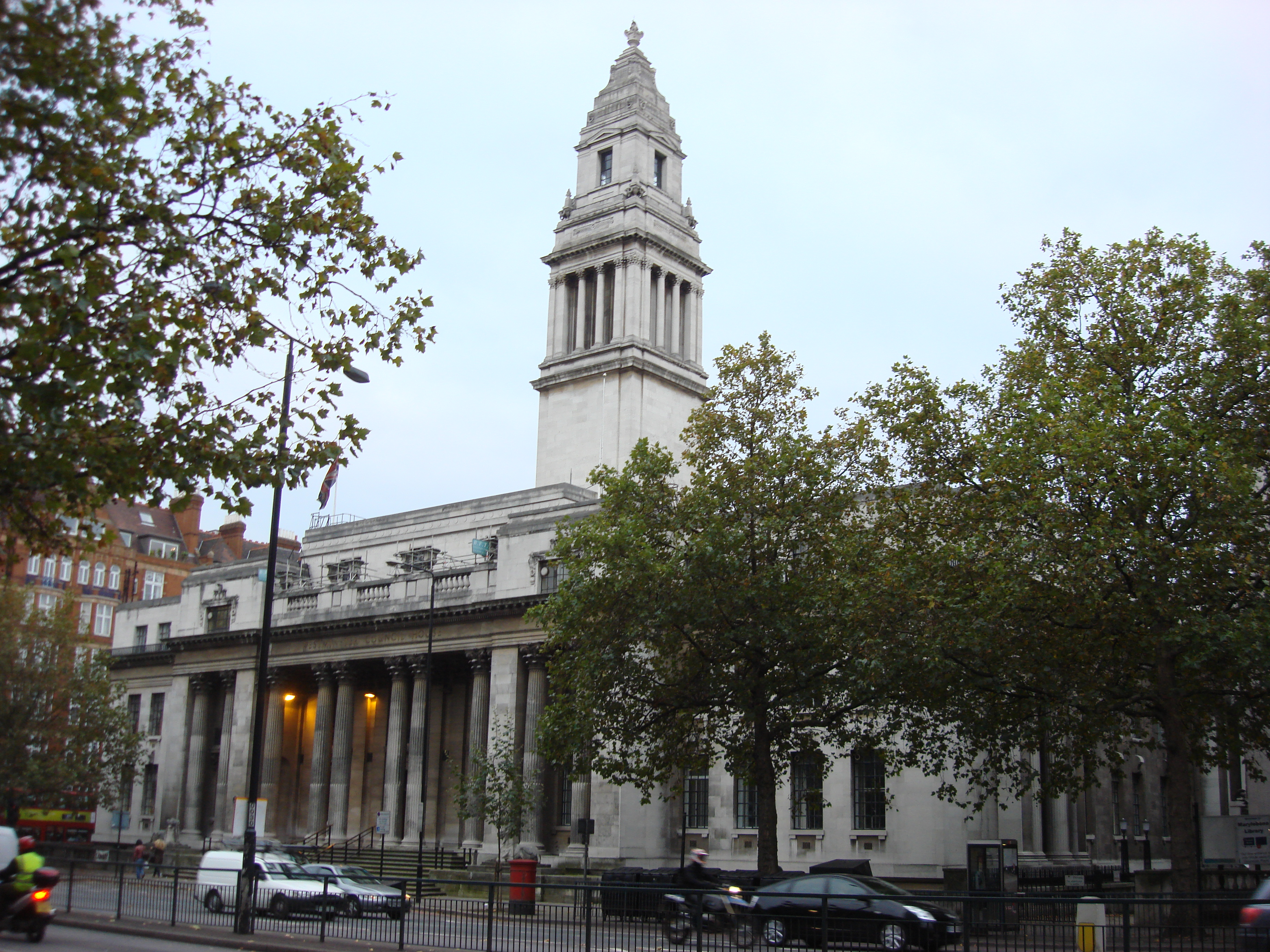
- Marylebone Town Hall

- St Marylebone within the County of London
- History
  - Origin: St Marylebone parish
  - Created: 1900
  - Abolished: 1965
  - Succeeded by: City of Westminster
- Status: Metropolitan borough
- Government: St Marylebone Borough Council
  - HQ: Marylebone Road
  - Motto: Fiat Secundum Verbum Tuum (Be it according to Thy Word)
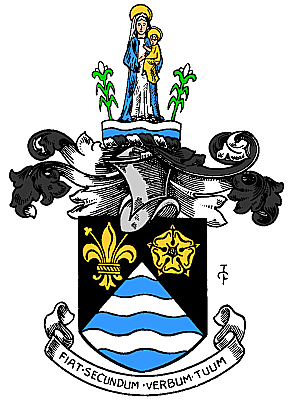
- Coat of arms of the borough council
- Map of boundary

The Metropolitan Borough of St Marylebone was a metropolitan borough of the County of London from 1900 to 1965. It was based directly on the previously existing civil parish of St Marylebone, Middlesex, which was incorporated into the Metropolitan Board of Works area in 1855, retaining a parish vestry, and then became part of the County of London in 1889.

Its area was that part of the current City of Westminster which is north of Oxford Street, and east of Maida Vale and Edgware Road. It included the areas Marylebone, Regent's Park, St John's Wood, and Lisson Grove, along with the western part of the district of Fitzrovia.

In 1965 it was abolished and its former area was amalgamated with that of the Metropolitan Borough of Paddington and the Metropolitan Borough of Westminster to form the City of Westminster.

== Origins and arms ==
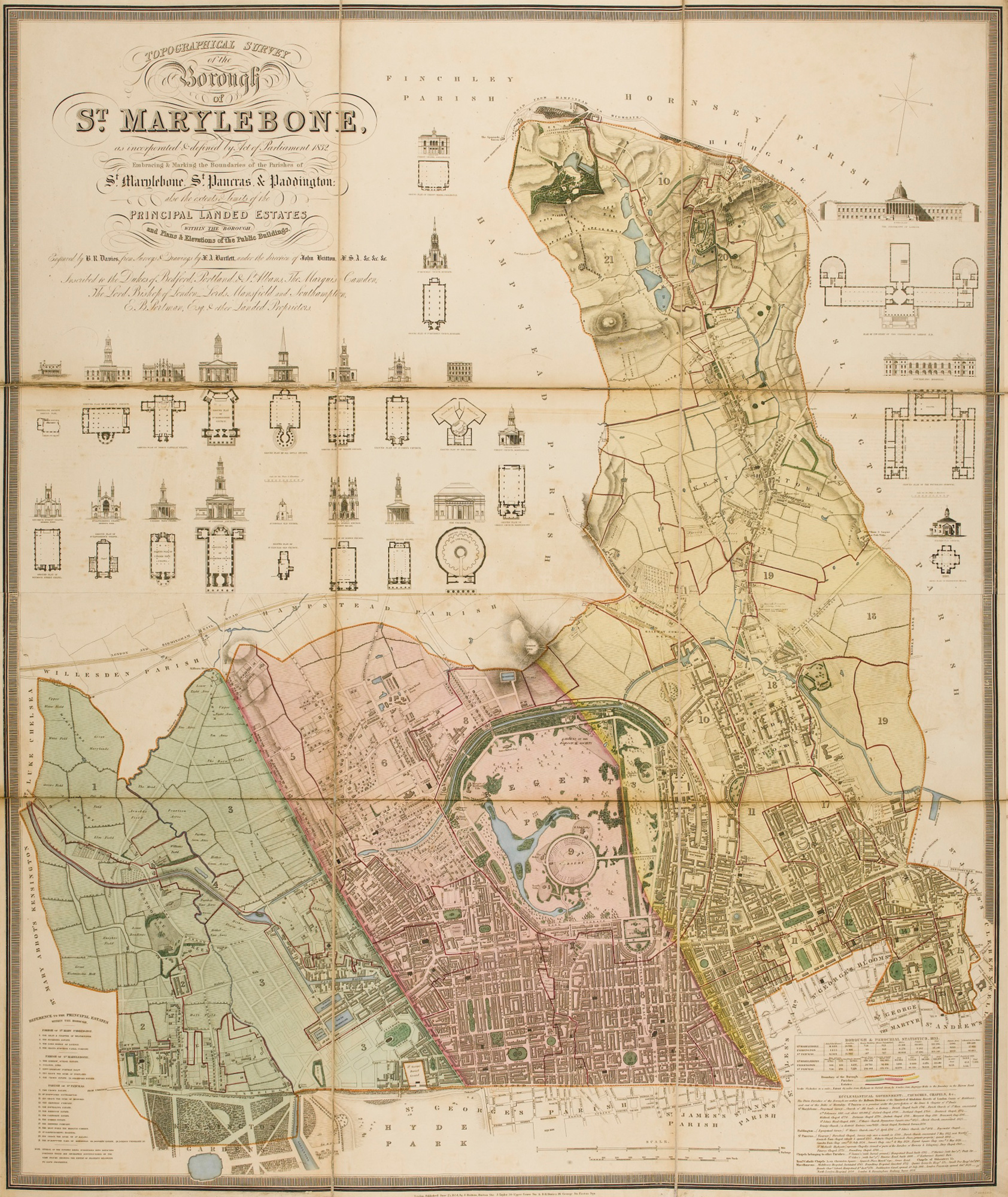
Topographical survey of St. Marylebone, St. Pancras and Paddington Parishes. Engraving by B.R. Davies, 1145 x 950 mm, dated 1834.

The name is derived from a chapel, dedicated to St Mary, and founded by Barking Abbey, the holders of the Manor of Tyburn. The chapel was named St Mary-le-Bourne, for the bourne, or River Tyburn. In the borough's coat of arms, the blue and white waves represent this stream; the lily and rose, derived from Barking Abbey, represent the legend that when the Virgin's tomb was opened it was found to contain lilies and roses.

The motto: Fiat Secundum Verbatum Tuum, is from the Gospel of Luke Ch.I v.38 and translates as Be it according to Thy Word.

The arms were granted by the College of Arms on 17 August 1901.

== Town hall ==
Following a competition in 1911, Sir Edwin Cooper was commissioned to design Marylebone Town Hall. The building, in Marylebone Road was built 1914–20. The building is faced with Portland stone and is an example of Edwardian Graeco-Roman classicism, with a tower in the style of Christopher Wren and fluted columns. Cooper also designed the 1938–39 extension in a simpler style to house the public library.

== Population and area ==
The borough covered an area of 1,473 acres (6.0 km^{2}). The population found in the Census was:

St Marylebone Vestry 1801–1899

Year	1801	1811	1821	1831	1841	1851	1861	1871	1881	1891
Pop.	63,982	75,624	96,040	122,206	138,164	157,696	161,680	159,254	154,910	142,404

Metropolitan Borough 1900–1961

Year	1901	1911	1921	1931	1941	1951	1961
Population	133,301	118,160	104,173	97,627		75,821	69,045

== Politics ==
A map showing the wards of St Marylebone Metropolitan Borough as they appeared in 1916.

Under the Metropolis Management Act 1855 any parish that exceeded 2,000 ratepayers was to be divided into wards; as such the incorporated vestry of Marylebone was divided into eight wards (electing vestrymen): No. 1 or Hamilton Terrace (9), No. 2 or St Johns Wood Terrace (9), No. 3 or New Church Street (15), No. 4 or Dorset Square & Regents Park (15), No. 5 or Bryanstone (18), No. 6 or Portman (18), No. 7 or Portland Place (18) and No. 8 or Cavendish Square (18).

The metropolitan borough was divided into nine wards for elections: Bryanston Square, Cavendish, Church Street, Dorset Square & Regent's Park, Hamilton Terrace, Langham, Park Crescent, Portman and St John's Wood Terrace.

=== Parliament constituency ===
For elections to Parliament, the borough was divided into two constituencies:

- Marylebone East
- Marylebone West

In 1918 the borough's representation was reduced to one seat:

- St Marylebone
