= Metropolitan Borough of Fulham =

Former borough in London

Coordinates: 51.4796°N 0.1950°W

Fulham
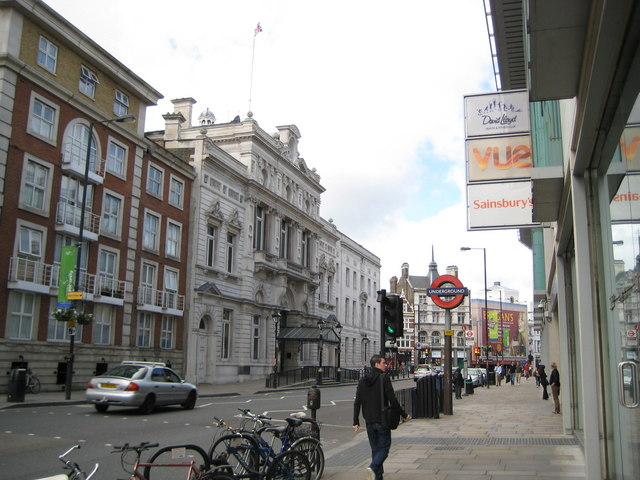
- Fulham Town Hall

- Fulham within the County of London
- History
  - Created: 1900
  - Abolished: 1965
  - Succeeded by: London Borough of Hammersmith
- Status: Metropolitan borough
- Government: Fulham Borough Council
  - HQ: Fulham Broadway
  - Motto: Pro Civibus et Civitate (For the citizens and the city)
- Coat of arms of the borough council
- Map of borough boundary

The Metropolitan Borough of Fulham was a civil parish and, from 1900, a metropolitan borough in the County of London. It was a riverside borough. In 1965 it was merged with the Metropolitan Borough of Hammersmith to form the London Borough of Hammersmith. The local authority was Fulham Vestry before 1900 and Fulham Borough Council after 1900.

== History ==
Fulham was an ancient parish, that had historically included Hammersmith. In 1855 the two parishes had been brought together again as the Fulham District. In 1886 the Hammersmith Vestry and Fulham Vestry became the local authorities for their respective parishes. In 1900 the parish of Fulham also became a metropolitan borough. The vestry was replaced by a borough council. The civil parish and metropolitan borough were abolished in 1965 and replaced by the London Borough of Hammersmith and Hammersmith London Borough Council.

== Geography ==
It was a riverside borough. It corresponded to the ancient parish of Fulham. It included Walham Green, Parsons Green, Hurlingham, Sands End, West Kensington and part of Chelsea Harbour to the west of Counter's Creek. Over its existence the borough's area varied from 1,704 to 1,707 acres (6.9 km^{2}).

== Governance ==
=== Fulham Vestry ===
A map showing the wards of Fulham Metropolitan Borough as they appeared in 1916.

Under the Metropolis Management Act 1855 any parish that exceeded 2,000 ratepayers was to be divided into wards; however the parish of Fulham did not exceed this number so was not divided into wards. In 1883-84 the population had increased enough for the parish to be divided into three wards (electing vestrymen): North End (27), Walham (27) and South Fulham (18). In 1894 as its population had increased the newly incorporated vestry was re-divided into eight wards (electing vestrymen): Baron's Court (12), Margravine (9), Munster (9), Lillie (12), Walham (12), Town (6), Hurlingham (3) and Sands End (9).

=== Fulham Borough Council ===
The metropolitan borough was divided into eight wards for elections: Baron's Court, Hurlingham, Lillie, Margravine, Munster, Sands End, Town, and Walham.

=== Town hall ===
The borough was administered from Fulham Town Hall, on Fulham Broadway, in Walham Green. The hall had been built in 1888 – 1890 for the Fulham vestry, and was in the classical renaissance style. When the London Borough of Hammersmith and Fulham was formed, Hammersmith Town Hall was adopted as the administrative centre. Some offices remain at Fulham however, and contains a registry office. The grand hall is a popular venue for concerts and dances. The london borough council also makes the building available for filming purposes.

=== Coat of arms ===
Device adopted in 1900

When the metropolitan borough was formed it carried on using the unofficial arms adopted by its predecessor, Fulham vestry in 1886. This was a quartered shield, with a depiction of a bridge in the first and fourth quarters. The bridge in the first quarter was the original wooden Putney Bridge, opened in 1729 with its toll houses. Its replacement, the present Putney Bridge, constructed of stone, was shown in the fourth quarter. The new bridge was opened in 1886, when the arms were designed. The second quarter showed crossed swords, from the arms of the Bishop of London. The manor of Fulham was held by the bishop from 691, and his official residence, Fulham Palace, was built in the area. The third quarter was the arms then associated with the county of Middlesex, in which Fulham lay until 1889. The three seaxes on a red field was also regarded as the arms of Essex.

In 1927, councillor F. H. Barber, proprietor of Barber's Department Store in the borough, offered to pay the costs of a grant of arms and new civic regalia. Accordingly, an official grant was obtained from the College of Arms on 12 October of that year, blazoned as follows:

Barry wavy of ten, Argent and azure, on a Saltire gules, two swords in Saltire points upwards of the first enfiled of a Mitre Or, and for the Crest upon a Mural Crown of Seven turrets Or and Ancient Rowing Ship in full sail Sable, the Flags per fesse Argent and Azure charged on the sail with a Rose Gules, surmounted by a Rose Argent barbed Vert and seeded proper.

The silver and blue wavy field was for the River Thames, the swords and mitre signifying the Bishop of London. The crest rose from a gold mural crown, resembling a city wall, and thus municipal government. The crest itself was a black ship, recalling an expedition to Fulham by the Danes in 879. The main sail was charged with a Tudor rose, recalling the importance of the area in that era, when Fulham Palace was rebuilt. The Latin motto, Pro Civibus Et Civitate, was translated as "for citizens and state". The waves from the shield, the two swords, the mitre and most of the crest was brought to the coat of arms of the London Borough of Hammersmith and Fulham when Fulham and Hammersmith merged to form a new London borough in 1965.

== Population ==
The population, as recorded at the census, was:

Fulham Vestry 1801-1899

Year	1801	1811	1821	1831	1841	1851	1861	1871	1881	1891
Population	4,428	5,903	6,492	7,317	9,319	11,886	15,539	23,350	42,900	91,639

Metropolitan Borough 1900–1961

Year	1901	1911	1921	1931	1941	1951	1961
Population	137,289	153,284	157,938	150,928		122,064	111,791

== Parliamentary representation ==
For elections to Parliament, the borough was represented by the Fulham constituency. In 1918 representation was increased to the two seats of Fulham East and Fulham West. In 1955 it was reduced to 1 1/2 seats. The seat shared with the Metropolitan Borough of Hammersmith was Barons Court.
