= County of London =

County of England, 1889–1965

Coordinates: 51.5°N 0.1°W

London County of London
- County
- County of London shown within England
- Area
  - 1911: 74,816 acres (302.77 km^{2})
  - 1961: 74,903 acres (303.12 km^{2})
- Population
  - 1911: 4,521,685
  - 1961: 3,200,484
- Density
  - 1911: 60/acre
  - 1961: 42/acre
- History
  - Origin: District of the Metropolitan Board of Works
  - Created: 1889
  - Abolished: 1965
  - Succeeded by: Greater London
- Status: Administrative and (smaller) ceremonial county
- Government: London County Council
  - HQ: County Hall, Lambeth
- Coat of arms of London County Council
- Subdivisions
  - Type: Parishes and districts (1889–1900); Metropolitan boroughs (1900–1965)
- Boroughs numbered 2–29 (1 is the City)

The County of London was a county of England from 1889 to 1965, corresponding to the area known today as Inner London. It was created as part of the general introduction of elected county government in England, by way of the Local Government Act 1888. The Act created an administrative County of London, which included within its territory the City of London. However, the City of London and the County of London formed separate ceremonial counties for "non-administrative" purposes. The local authority for the county was the London County Council (LCC), which initially performed only a limited range of functions, but gained further powers during its 76-year existence. The LCC provided very few services within the City of London, where the ancient Corporation monopolised local governance. In 1900, the lower-tier civil parishes and district boards were replaced with 28 new metropolitan boroughs. The territory of the county was 74,903 acres (303.12 km^{2}) in 1961. During its existence, there was a long-term decline in population as more residents moved into the outer suburbs; there were periodic reviews of the local government structures in the greater London area and several failed attempts to expand the boundaries of the county. In 1965, the London Government Act 1963 replaced the county with the much larger Greater London administrative area.

== Geography ==
The county occupied an area of just under 75,000 acres (30,351 ha) and lay within the London Basin. It was divided into two parts (north and south) by the River Thames, which was the most significant geographical feature. It was bordered by the River Lea with Essex to the north-east, Kent to the south-east, Surrey the south-west and Middlesex to the north-west. The highest point was Hampstead Heath in the north of the county at 440 feet (134 m), which is one of the highest points in London. In 1900 a number of boundary anomalies were abolished. These included the loss of the Alexandra Park exclave to Middlesex, gaining South Hornsey in return, and the transfer of Penge to Kent.

== History ==
=== Creation of the county ===
The Metropolis Management Act 1855 revolutionised and amalgamated much of local government across an identical, newly formed, area. This reform created an indirectly elected Metropolitan Board of Works which initially built and maintained infrastructure for the metropolis, including modern sanitation. Over time the board gained more functions and became the de facto local authority and provider of new services for the London area. The board operated in those parts of the counties of Middlesex, Surrey and Kent that had been designated by the General Register Office as "the Metropolis" for the purposes of the Bills of Mortality. This area had been administered separately from the City of London, which came under the control of the Corporation of London.

There had been several attempts during the 19th century to reform London government, either by expanding the City of London to cover the whole of the metropolitan area; by creating a new county of London; or by creating ten municipal corporations matching the parliamentary boroughs of the metropolis. These had all been defeated in Parliament, in part because of the agency power of the City Corporation. Ultimately, the Local Government Act 1888 and the introduction of county councils in England provided the mechanism for creating a territory and authority encompassing the expanded London area. For expediency, the area of the metropolitan board was chosen for the new county, and no attempt was made to select new boundaries. This area had been out of line with the expansion of London even in 1855. For example, it anomalously omitted built-up and expanding areas such as West Ham, but included some sparsely populated areas on the metropolitan fringe.

The City of London and the County of London each formed counties for "non-administrative" purposes, with a separate Lord Lieutenant and High Sheriff for the county of London. However, the administrative county, which corresponded to the area of control of the county council, also included the City of London. In practice, the county council had very little authority over the ancient City, with some powers over drainage, roads, fire brigade, embankment of the river and flood prevention. In common with the rest of the country, the 1888 Act provided no reform of lower-tier authorities and the county was, initially at least, administered locally by a series of parish vestries and district boards.

=== County council ===
The local authority for the county was the London County Council (LCC). Initially, the LCC provided the services it had inherited from the Metropolitan Board of Works. Eventually, however, it absorbed functions from ad-hoc agencies such the London School Board and Metropolitan Asylums Board. The council was initially based in Spring Gardens, but moved to a purpose-built County Hall in the 1930s. The housing policy of the council included provision of large housing estates outside the boundaries of the county, such as that at Becontree.

=== Local government ===
In 1900, eleven years after its foundation, the London Government Act divided the County of London into 28 metropolitan boroughs. These replaced the ancient parish vestries and district boards as the second tier of local government.

County of London boroughs numbered in the information box on the right side:

Metropolitan Borough	Successor(s)	No. on map
City of London †	City of London	1
Battersea	Wandsworth	28
Bermondsey	Southwark	8
Bethnal Green	Tower Hamlets	6
Camberwell	Southwark	10
Chelsea	Kensington and Chelsea	29
Deptford	Lewisham	11
Finsbury	Islington	4
Fulham	Hammersmith and Fulham	25
Greenwich	Greenwich	14
Hackney	Hackney	16
Hammersmith	Hammersmith and Fulham	24
Hampstead	Camden	20
Holborn	Camden	3
Islington	Islington	18
Kensington (Royal Borough)	Kensington and Chelsea	23
Lambeth	Lambeth	27
Lewisham	Lewisham	12
Paddington	Westminster	22
Poplar	Tower Hamlets	15
Shoreditch	Hackney	5
Southwark	Southwark	9
St Marylebone	Westminster	21
St Pancras	Camden	19
Stepney	Tower Hamlets	7
Stoke Newington	Hackney	17
Wandsworth	Lambeth, Wandsworth	26
Westminster (City)	Westminster	2
Woolwich	Greenwich, Newham	13

† Not a metropolitan borough.

=== Decline in population ===
Population fell after World War I and as recorded at each census until its 1965 demise. In 1901, the population was 4.5 million and by 1961 it had fallen to 3.2 million. Following the 1931 census, more of the population of "Greater London" (defined at the time as the Metropolitan Police District and City of London) lived outside the county than in it. The following table illustrates the approximate population according to the census at various intervals:

Year	Central Area†	Inner Ring‡	Second Ring§	County of London Total	Outer Ring# of Greater London
1881	1,743,000	1,008,000	1,093,000	3,844,000	950,000
1901	1,623,000	1,201,000	1,601,000	4,425,000	1,422,000
1921	1,364,000	1,186,000	1,933,000	4,483,000	2,993,000
1931	1,260,000	1,163,000	1,976,000	4,399,000	3,807,000
1951	738,000	927,000	1,683,000	3,348,000	4,998,000

†The City of London and the Metropolitan Boroughs of Bermondsey, Bethnal Green, Finsbury, Holborn, St Marylebone, St Pancras, Shoreditch, Southwark, Stepney and Westminster.

‡The Metropolitan Boroughs of Battersea, Chelsea, Islington, Kensington, Lambeth and Paddington.

§The Metropolitan Boroughs of Camberwell, Deptford, Fulham, Greenwich, Hackney, Hammersmith, Hampstead, Lewisham, Poplar, Stoke Newington, Wandsworth and Woolwich.

#Defined as the area of the Metropolitan Police district outside the County of London.

=== Abolition ===
London boroughs covering the area of the former County of London within modern Greater London

The county of London was abolished in 1965 and was replaced by the fivefold-sized Greater London, which took in nearly all of Middlesex, along with areas in Surrey, Kent, Essex and Hertfordshire. Middlesex and Surrey had already been reduced in 1889 on the county's creation. The area "that had been" has since been known statutorily as Inner London and an Inner London Education Authority operated in the area until 1990. The 28 metropolitan boroughs were merged to form 12 new Inner London boroughs.

== See also ==
- List of civil parishes in the County of London in 1891
- Home counties
- London postal district

== Works cited ==
- Robson, William A. (1939). The government and misgovernment of London. London: Allen & Unwin. OCLC 504395625.
