= Hammersmith (disambiguation) =

Hammersmith is a district of London. It can also refer to:

- Hammersmith (London County Council constituency)
- Hammersmith (UK Parliament constituency)
- Hammersmith (electoral division), a division of the former Greater London Council from 1965 to 1973
- London Borough of Hammersmith and Fulham, a borough in London
- Metropolitan Borough of Hammersmith, a former borough in London
- Hammersmith tube station (Circle and Hammersmith & City lines)
- Hammersmith tube station (District and Piccadilly lines)
- Hammersmith (Grove Road) railway station, closed in 1916
- Hammersmith (band), a Canadian rock band
- Hammersmith, Derbyshire, an area of Ripley, Derbyshire, England
- Hammersmith (Holst), a composition by Gustav Holst
- Jerome Hammersmith (1938–2021), Canadian politician
- Saugus Iron Works National Historic Site, a US colonial iron works
- Hammersmith Farm, Rhode Island
