= Coachmakers Arms, Hammersmith =

Former pub in Hammersmith, London

Coordinates: 51.492382°N 0.2303154°W

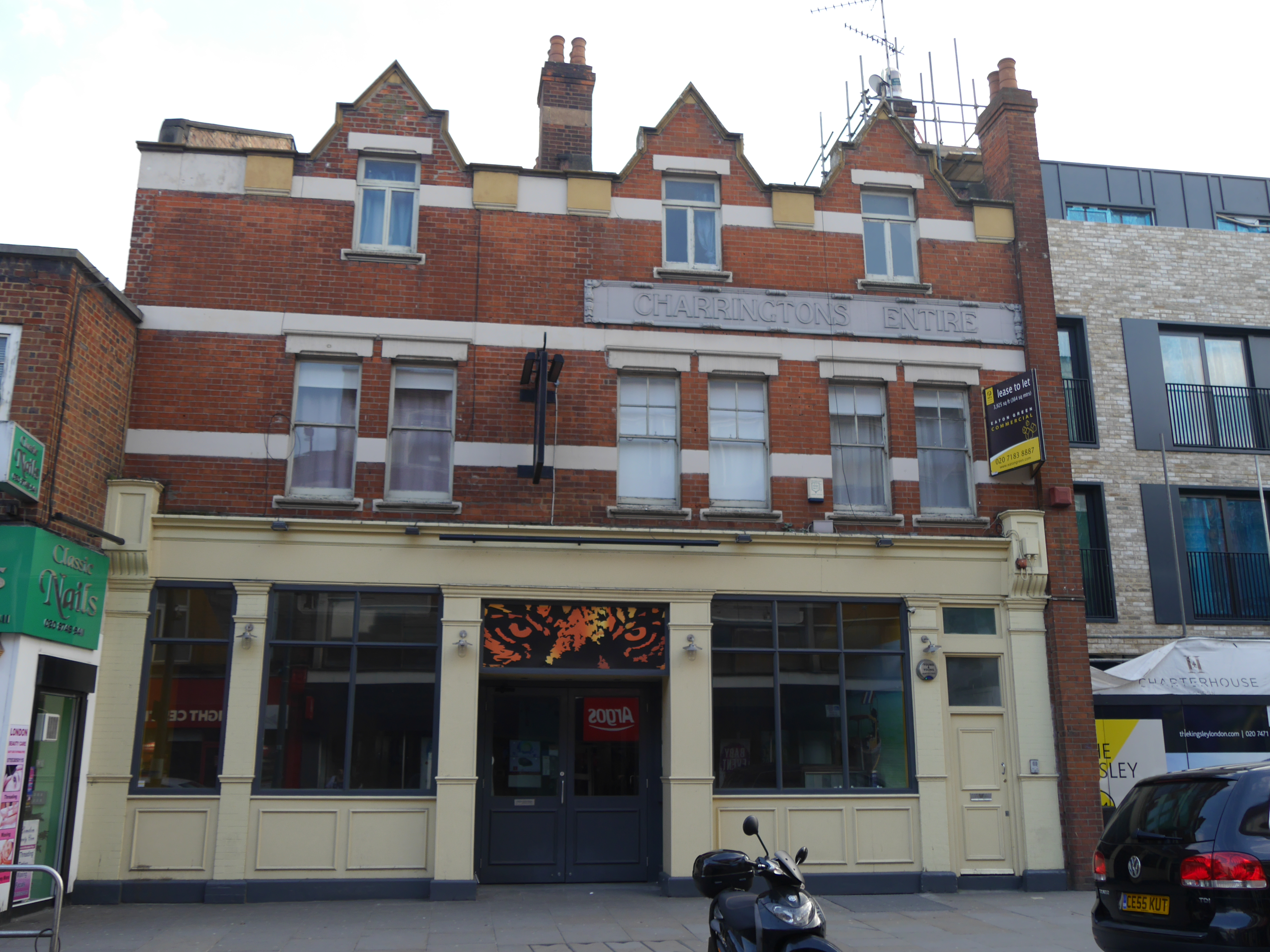
Coachmakers Arms, Hammersmith

The Coachmakers Arms is a former pub at 135 King Street, Hammersmith, London.

== History ==
It was built before 1874, and was a Charrington Brewery pub, as can be seen by "CHARRINGTON'S ENTIRE" in a large tiled panel the breadth of the pub, now painted over. It was extended into the shop next door by Charrington themselves.

In the 1980s, it had become the Penny Farthing, and by 2001 was a predominantly gay venue with music and cabaret at the weekends. This was one of several renamings before it closed in 2002 and became Autumn House, and then a Chinese restaurant, Gourmet Buffet, and Buddha Kitchen. It was to have become Tiger Bills by Christmas 2015.
