= St Paul's, Hammersmith =

Church in Hammersmith, London

Coordinates: 51.491507°N 0.22538°W

- Church of Saint Paul, Hammersmith
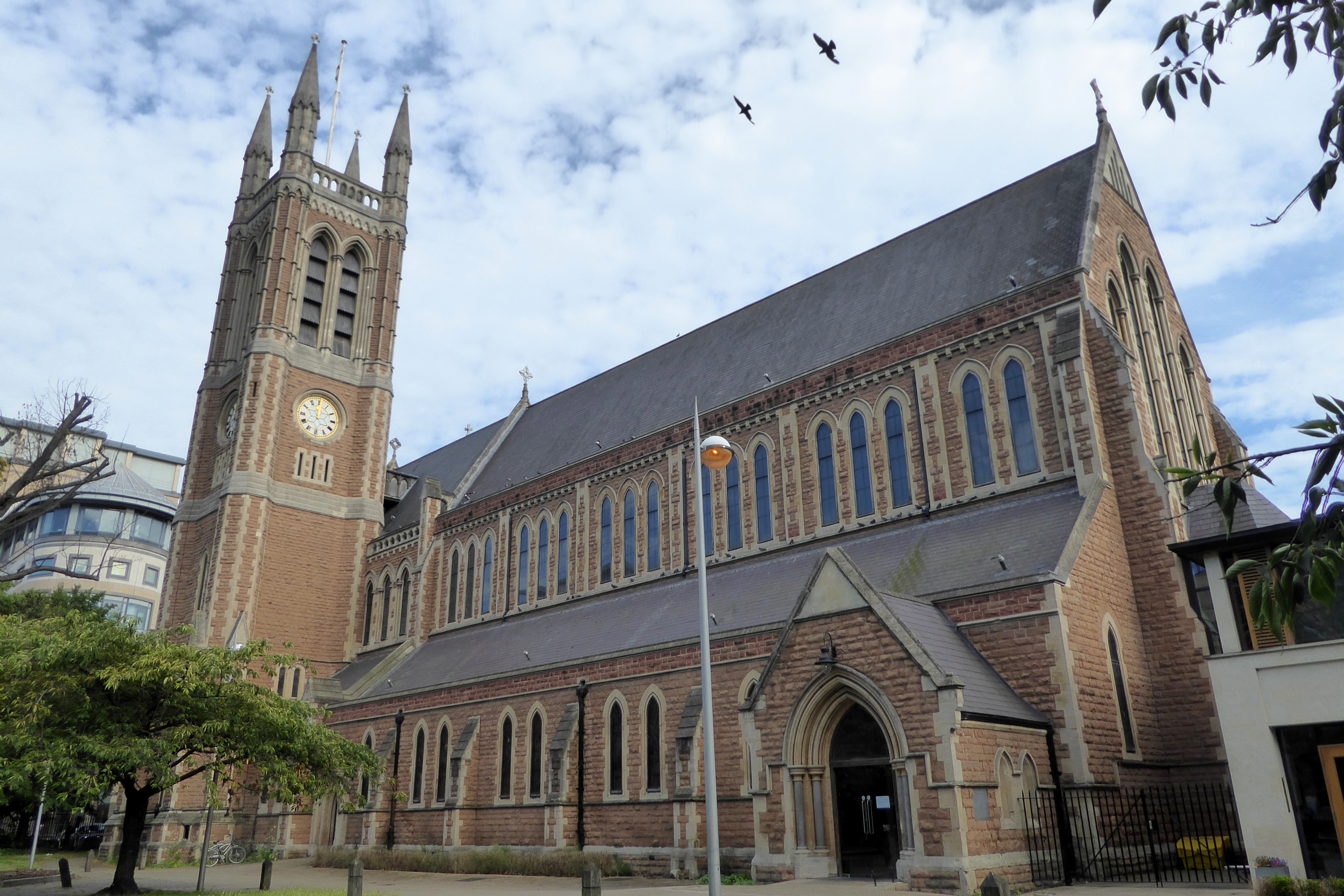
- St Paul's, Hammersmith
- Denomination: Church of England
- Churchmanship: Evangelical
- Website: www.sph.org

Administration
- Province: Canterbury
- Diocese: London
- Archdeaconry: Middlesex
- Deanery: Hammersmith and Fulham
- Parish: Parish of Hammersmith (until 1965)

Clergy
- Vicar: The Revd Pete Wynter

Listed Building – Grade II*
- Designated: 17 June 1954
- Reference no.: 1079802

St Paul's (also known as the Church of Saint Paul's) is a Grade II* listed Anglican church on Queen Caroline Street, Hammersmith, London.

The church is adjacent to Hammersmith flyover and a short walk from Hammersmith tube station.

== History ==
=== The original church ===
Hammersmith originated as a hamlet within the parish of Fulham, with All Saints Church as the parish church.

In the early 17th century, the distance of the hamlet and its increasing population from All Saints Church in Fulham led to demands for a chapel of ease to be built in the area.

On 5 December 1629, "Inhabitants of Hammersmith", including Sir Nicholas Crispe, a wealthy merchant who had lived since 1625 in a house on the riverside in Hammersmith, petitioned Bishop Laud, Bishop of London and later Archbishop of Canterbury, for the building of a chapel in Hammersmith, begging him to "consider the length and foulness of the way between Fulham and that place, in winter most toilsome, sometimes over ploughed lands, and almost unpassable". Edmund Sheffield, 2nd Earl of Mulgrave added a supporting letter for the cause

On 10 December 1629, Bishop Laud granted the petition "that the chapel be built as other churches are, east and west, without tricks", finding the contributions for building the chapel to be 242 pounds, 7 shillings and 4 pennies besides materials and an east window and the allowance for the minister to be 28 pounds, 31 shillings and 4 pennies. On 20 December 1629 Dr. Richard Cluette, Vicar of Fulham, wrote to Bishop Laud asking that all churchings taking place at the chapel be conducted at the altar and in veils, a tradition in Fulham. On 22 December 1629, Edmund Sheffield, 2nd Earl of Mulgrave, wrote to Bishop Laud, confirming no intention to derogate from the rights of All Saints Church, Fulham and attempting to put to bed rumours that the contributors were trying to install a "busy-header or factious man" as church minister. On 29 December 1629, Bishop Laud wrote to Edmund Sheffield, 2nd Earl of Mulgrave, confirming he was satisfied with the plot of land, manner of constructions and reservations made to protect the rights of the mother-church, All Saints Church, Fulham.

On 11 March 1629, the foundation stone was laid and consecrated by Bishop Laud.

On 7 June 1631, by an instrument under his episcopal seal, Bishop Laud granted a parcel of ground within the Manor of Fulham of length 105 feet (32 m) and width 132 feet (40 m) to the inhabitants of the hamlet for the purposes of building a chapel and cemetery at their own cost.

The Hammersmith Chapel was built principally by a subscription of inhabitants of the hamlet. The 2nd Earl of Mulgrave purchased the land in 1629, and the main contributor to the building fund was Sir Nicholas Crispe, who supplied £700 and bricks.

Before consecration, an agreement was executed in writing between Dr. Richard Cluette, Edmund Sheffield, 2nd Earl of Mulgrave, Richard Chest, Sir Nicholas Crispe, John Alston, Carew Saunders, Richard Warwick, Thomas Morton, Samuel Crispe, John Buck, Thomas Holden, Richard Chilton, strictly preserving the rights of the mother-church. The terms of the agreement stipulated that:

- Residents of Hammersmith were responsible for paying and maintaining a curate and repairing and maintaining for the chapel, from which the Vicar and inhabitants of Fulham were exempt.
- Residents of Hammersmith must continue to pay all tithes, oblations, fees, other emoluments and contributions to the repair of All Saints, Fulham.
- The Vicar of Fulham and residents of Fulham were no longer required to provide or pay for a curate in Hammersmith and not required to contribute to the maintenance of the chapel.
- Residents of Hammersmith must receive Holy Communion at All Saints, Fulham annually at Easter and were free to attend services at All Saints, Fulham at any time.
- Ceremonies (marriages, christenings, churchings and burials) were to be recorded in Fulham's parish register with fees to be paid to the Vicar of Fulham.
- The Hammersmith curate and churchwarden were responsible for providing weekly reports to Fulham on all ceremonies and associated fees.
- The Vicar of Fulham was not obligated to perform services at the chapel but may do so if he wishes and must have a reserved seat when he visits.

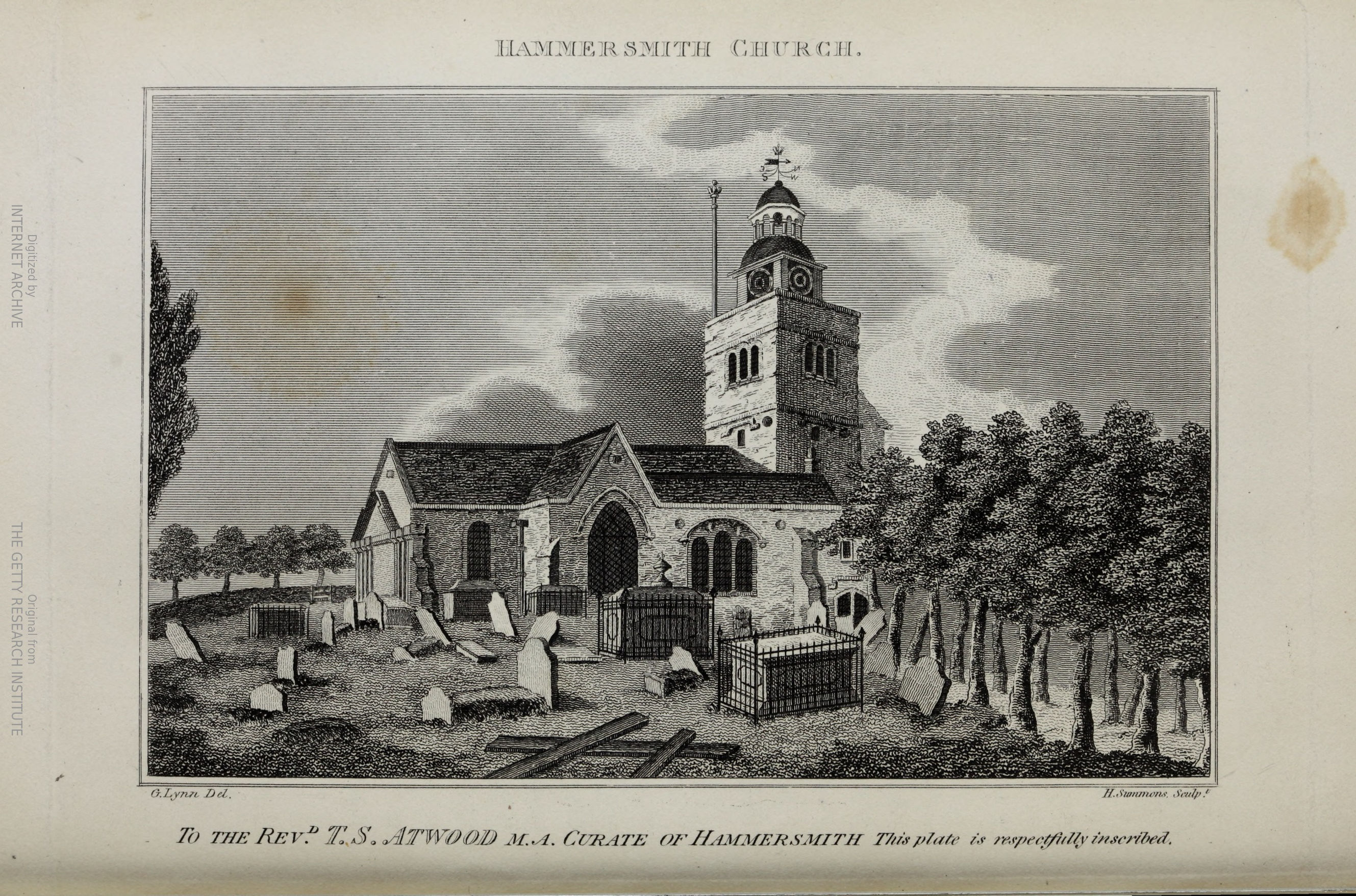
Hammersmith Church 1813

On 7 June 1631, the chapel of ease and cemetery were consecrated by Bishop Laud, alongside his biographer Peter Heylyn. The name of the chapel was to be known as the "Chappel of Saint Paul".

On 6 October 1646, Edmund Sheffield, 1st Earl of Mulgrave died and was buried at the church in a tomb of black and white marble 7 feet (2.1 m) long, 3 feet (0.91 m) high and 3 feet (0.91 m) over, defended with iron rails, where a monument to his memory was erected by his wife Mariana, Countess of Mulgrave.

On 26 February 1665, Sir Nicholas Crispe and was buried at the church in a monument of black and white marble 8 feet (2.4 m) long and 2 feet (0.61 m) wide, upon which was a brass head of King Charles, with an oval engraving:

This Effigies was Erected by the special Appointment of Sir Nicholas Crispe, Knight and Baronet, as grateful Commemoration of that Glorious Martyr King Charles I. of blessed Memory.

Under that oval was a white pedestal upon which was inscribed:

Within this Urne is Entomb'd the Heart of Sir Nicholas Crispe Kt. and Baronet, a Loyal Sharer in the Sufferings of his late and present Majesty. He first settled the Trade of Gold, and there Built the Castle of Cormentine. Died the 26th of February 1665. Aged 67.

=== The present church ===
In 1834, upon the passing of the Hammersmith Parish Act 1834, Hammersmith became a distinct parish with St Paul's as the parish church and vicarage under Francis Thomas Atwood as the new Vicar of Hammersmith.

Hammersmith was developing rapidly, helped by the arrival of the new Metropolitan Railway. At a public meeting held on 20 January 1880, the decision was taken to rebuild the church on the same site. It was felt that the building was no longer big enough to accommodate the growing population and 'The old unsightly structure is not worthy of being the chief witness to God in the midst of such an important Metropolitan Suburb as Hammersmith has now become.'

From 1882 to 1891, Chamberlen Brothers built St Paul's Church in Hammersmith, designed by architects J. P. Seddon and H. R. Gough. In July 1882 the Duke of Albany laid the foundation stone, and the nave of the new church was consecrated on 13 October 1883.

Like St Peter's Church in Hammersmith, St Paul's lost a significant portion of its land, including that with graves, when Hammersmith Flyover and the Great West Road were built in 1957–61.

Hammersmith Chess Club briefly used the Church Hall as their home venue from 1970 to 1975, before later moving on to Blythe House.

In 1983, the church pews were removed and replaced with more flexible seating.

In the 2000s, an extension was built onto the western end of the church, incorporating a new hall and kitchen, and accompanied by a major restoration programme. The work was done by Bryen & Langley and the extension was opened in 2011.

== Exterior ==
The church is designed in the Early English Gothic Style, with lancet windows, powerful buttresses, a high roof and an imposing tower.

== Interior ==
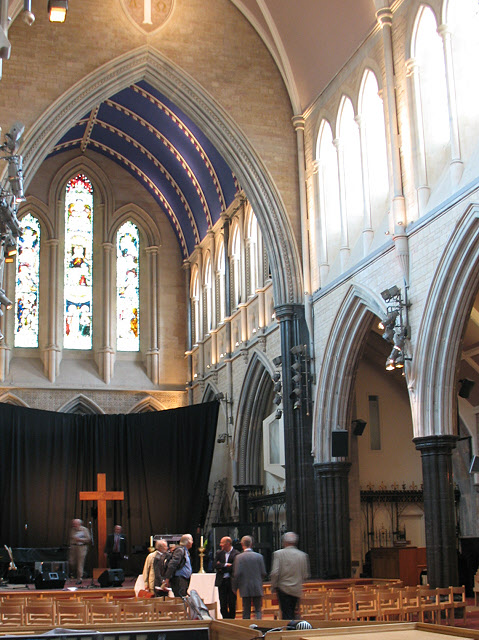
Interior of St Paul's Hammersmith (taken during restoration work)

The internal dimensions of St Paul's Church are: length 190 ft (57.9m), width 73 ft (22.25 m), height 63 ft (19.2m). It was designed to seat 1,400 people. The walls are of brown Ancaster stone, with Belgian marble used for the clustered columns and wall-linings. There are six bays, formed by the five main columns on each side, with white and blue Bath stone used for the arches and some carved decoration.

The pulpit came from the former church of All-Hallows-the-Great in the City of London. The pulpit was moved to a church in USA in the 2000s.

The stained glass windows of the church were made by Clayton and Bell. Those on the north side depict the life of Saint Paul, the apostle of the Church; while those on the south side depict the life of Saint Peter, the other apostle who is usually paired with Paul.

There are two ceiling height paintings by Charlie Mackesey of the crucifixion of Jesus and the Prodigal Son in the chancel of the Church.

== See also ==
- HTB network
