= Salutation, Hammersmith =

Pub in Hammersmith, London

Coordinates: 51.492824°N 0.232820°W

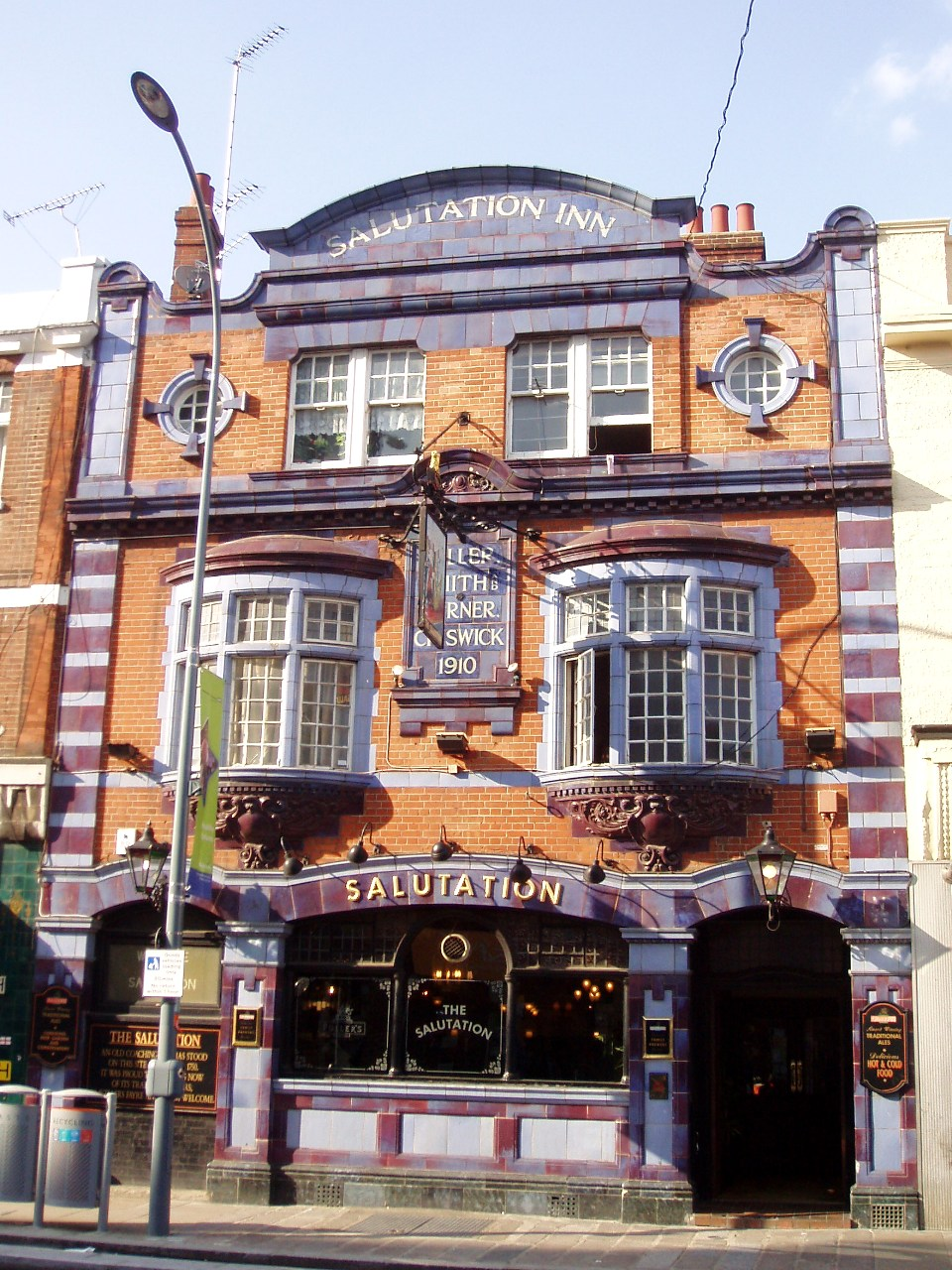
The Salutation

The Salutation Inn is a Grade II listed public house at 154 King Street, Hammersmith, London.

It was built in 1910, and the architect was A.P. Killick.

It is a Fuller's Brewery pub.
