= Hammersmith flyover =

Elevated roadway in west London

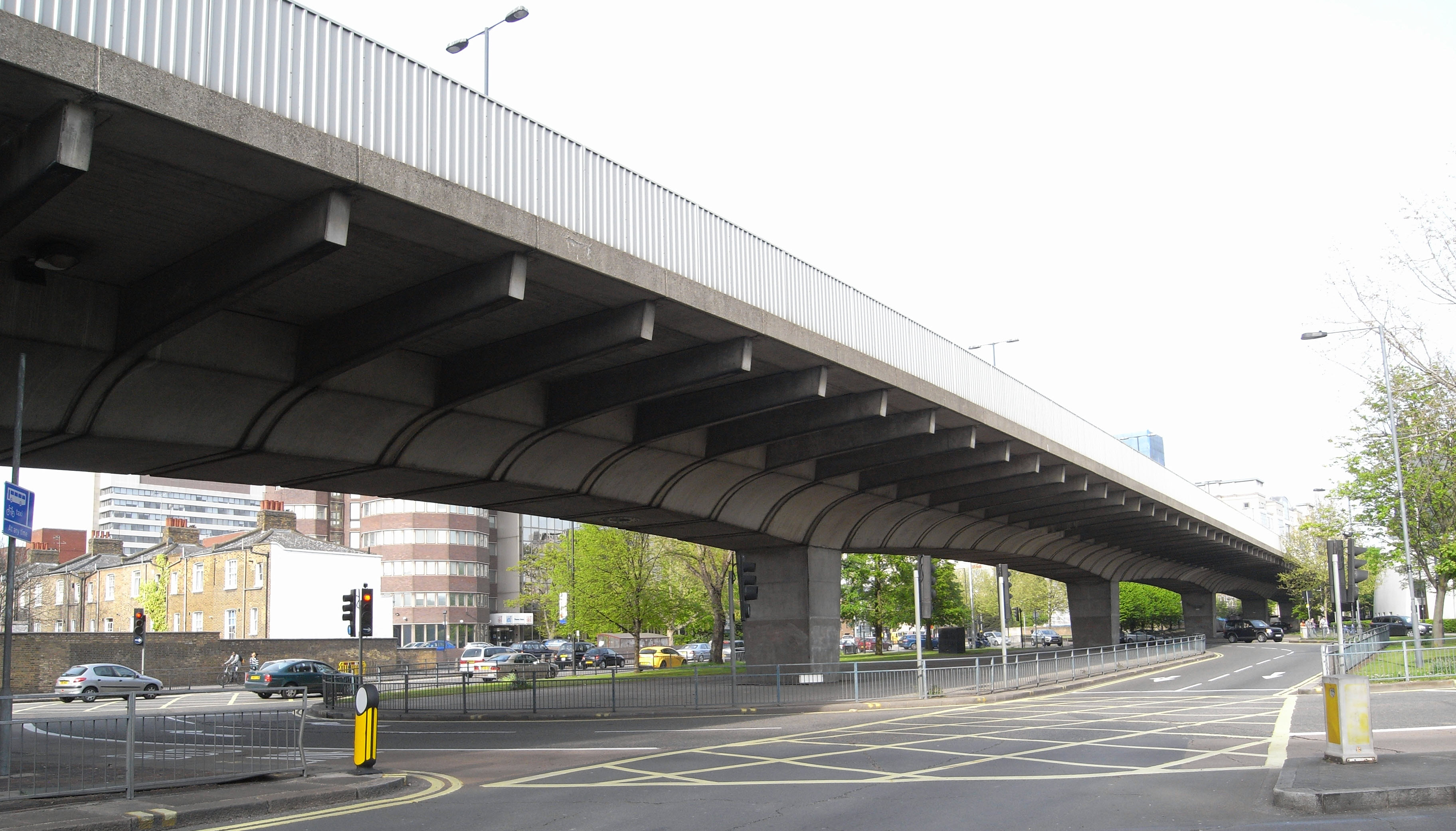
- Coordinates: 51°29′28″N 0°13′39″W
- Carries: A4
- Maintained by: Transport for London

Characteristics
- Total length: 622 m (2,041 ft)
- Width: 18.6 m (61 ft)
- Longest span: 42.7 m (140 ft)
- No. of spans: 16

History
- Architect: Hubert Bennett
- Designer: G. Maunsell & Partners
- Constructed by: J&J Dean Builders (Oscar James Dean, Malcolm James Dean & Alan Dean)
- Construction start: January 1960
- Construction end: 16 November 1961
- Construction cost: £1,200,000
- Opened: 16 November 1961

Statistics
- Daily traffic: 85,549 (2011)

Location
- Interactive map of Hammersmith flyover

The Hammersmith flyover is an elevated roadway in West London which carries the A4 arterial road over and to one side of the central Hammersmith gyratory system, and it links together the Cromwell Road extension (Talgarth Road) with the start of the Great West Road. It is one of the first examples of an elevated road using reinforced concrete.

== Design ==
An elevated road employing reinforced concrete balanced cantilever beam supports with a single central column. The deck spine and wings are of hollow prestressed concrete design, with each span being tensioned by longitudinal tendons (four clusters, each of sixteen 29 mm (1.1 in) steel cables). The flyover was designed by G. Maunsell & Partners, Consulting Engineers, led by Peter Wroth and is 622 metres (2,041 ft) long. When built the flyover included heating cables to "eliminate ice formation". The system was initially successful, though a £4800 bill for the 1962–63 winter (equivalent to £100,000 in 2025) "so shocked Hammersmith Borough Council that, as a protest, it cut off the electricity". London County Council paid the bill after this.

The heating became defective at some point a "long time" before 2000.

== History ==
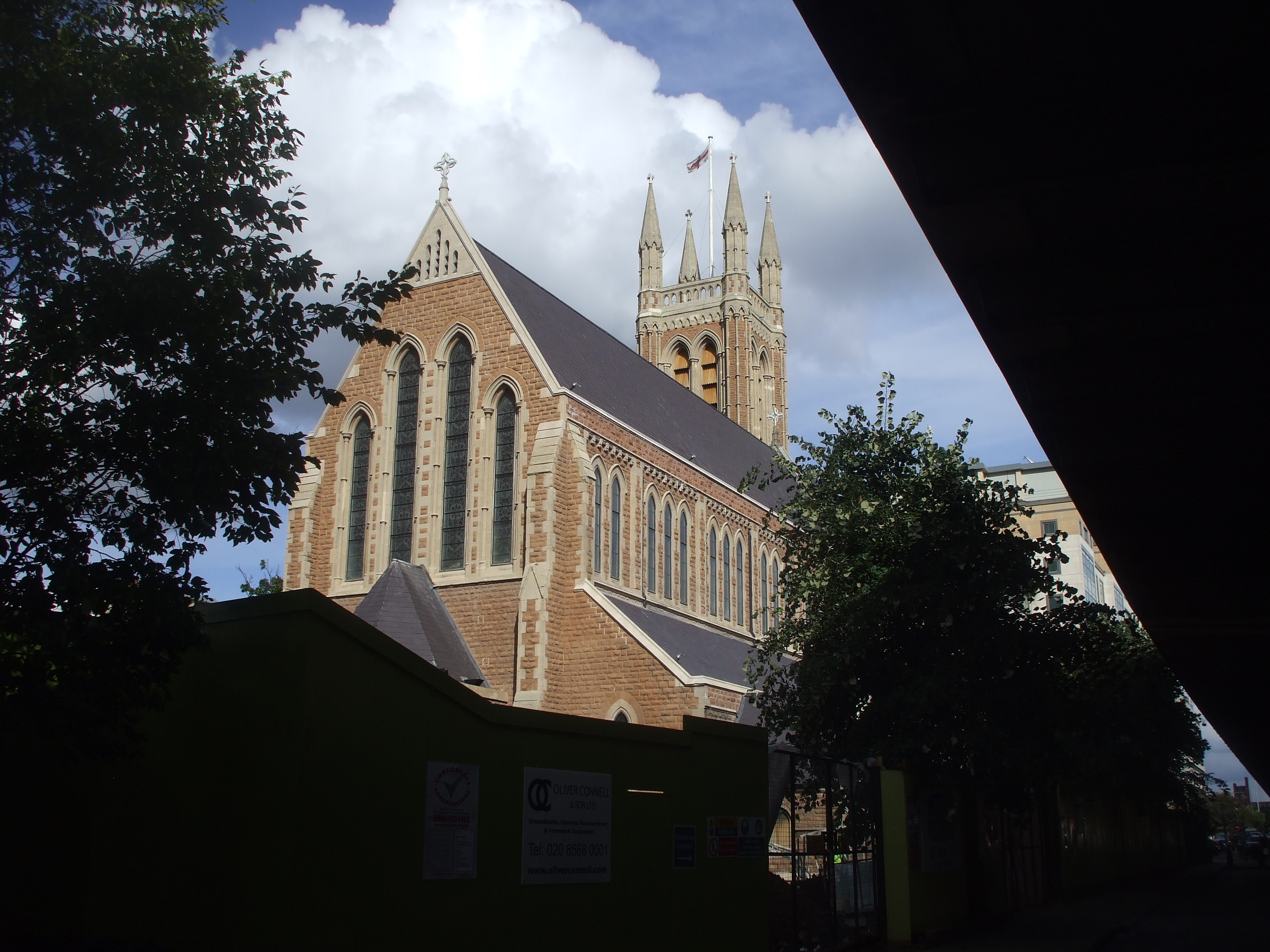
St Paul's, Hammersmith seen from under the flyover

Completed in 1961, it was one of the first examples of its design. J&J Dean, a London-based civil engineering contractor, built the flyover at a cost of £1.2 million. The then Conservative Transport Minister Ernest Marples had been a Marples, Ridgway shareholder. To avoid a conflict of interest Marples undertook to sell his controlling shareholder interest in the company as soon as he became Minister of Transport in October 1959, although there was a purchaser's requirement that he buy back the shares after he ceased to hold office, at the price paid, should the purchaser so require.

Much of the churchyard of St Paul's Church, the oldest parish church of Hammersmith, had to be cleared for the project, including an old wall and many grave markers.

== Repair work ==
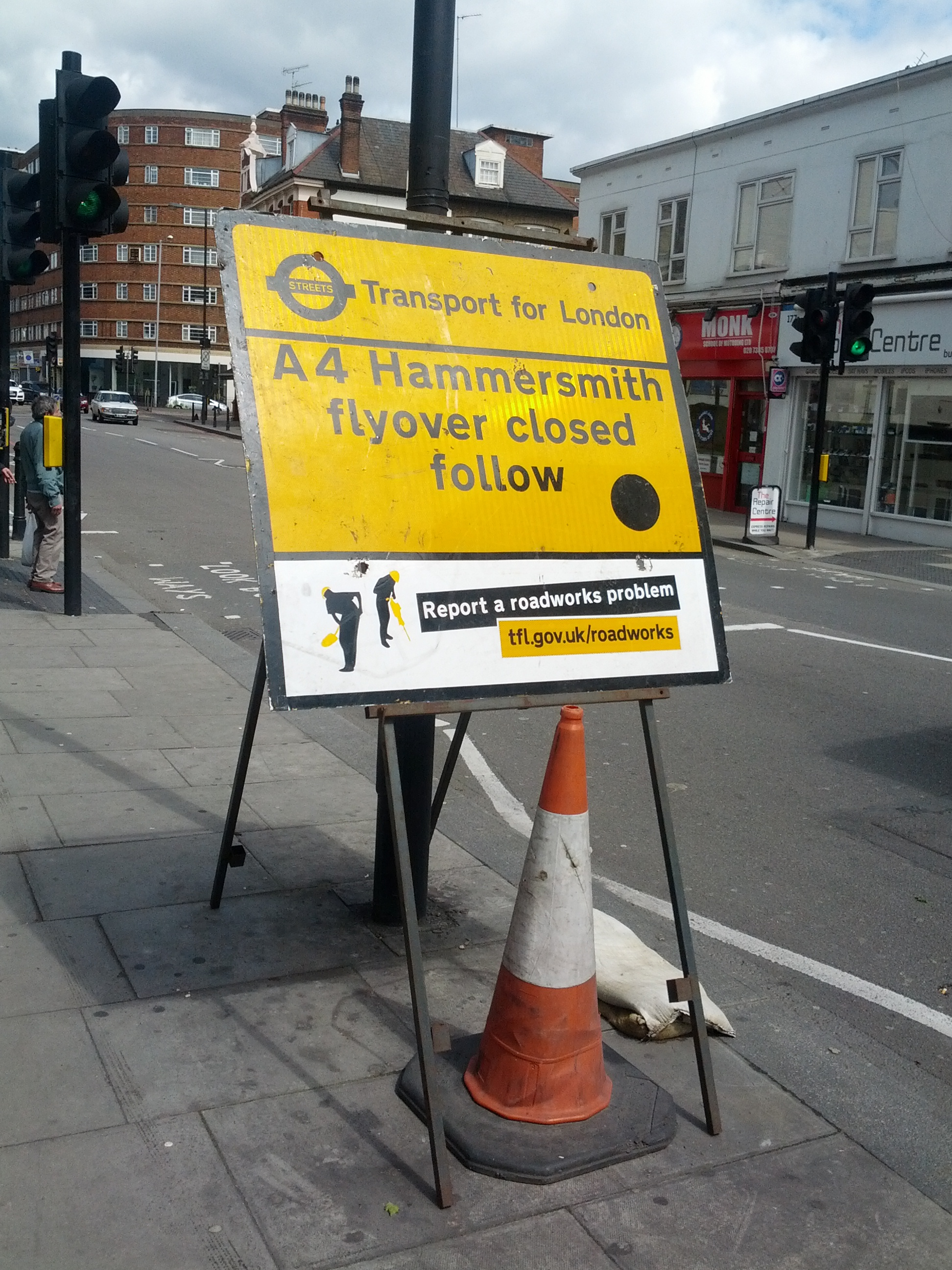
Sign showing temporary flyover closure

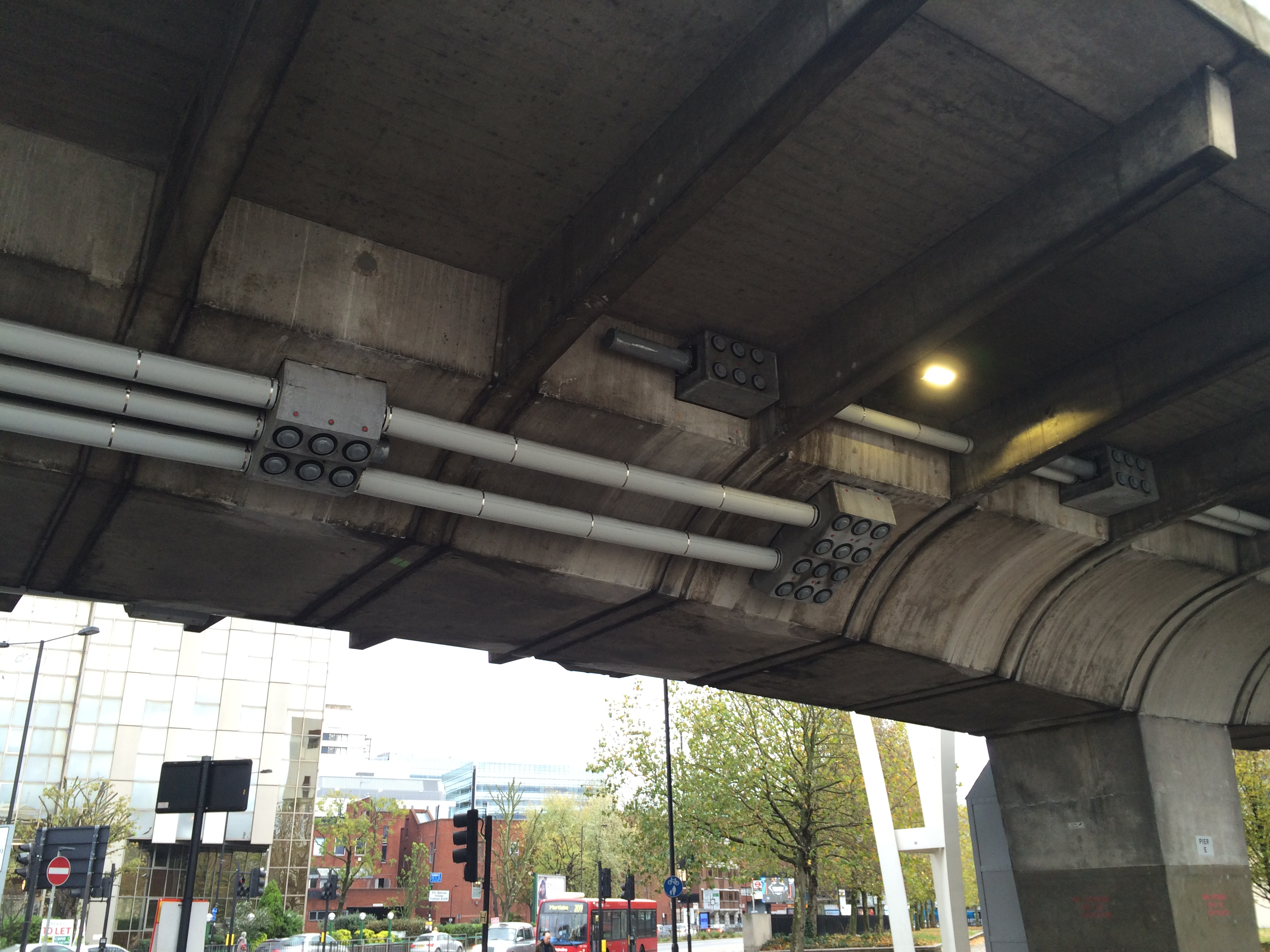
The flyover after repair work was completed in 2015, with new bolts and sections of tensile cable visible on the surface of the structure

In December 2011 Transport for London (TfL) issued a statement that "damage to the ageing 1960s structure has been caused by water ingress, including salt water due to grit laid during the winter months, which has corroded and weakened the cables which help support the flyover". TfL stated there was "a very remote possibility that Hammersmith Flyover [would] collapse".

The Fulham & Hammersmith Chronicle claim that they were contacted on 14 December 2011 by a whistleblower who revealed that problems with the structure were far more severe than was being made public. The flyover was closed to all traffic from 23 December 2011 to 12 January 2012 after structural defects were discovered. From 13 January to 27 May the bridge was only open to a single lane of light traffic in each direction for repair work. TfL planned to strengthen six of the sixteen arches before the London 2012 Olympic Games and the remaining ten arches after the games. New post-tensioned steel cables "are being installed in concrete blocks above and below the deck's central reservation". The repairs are now complete and extended the life of the bridge by 15 years. The cost of repairs was estimated to be around £10 million.

In June 2013 it was announced further repairs were required, a project estimated to cost £60m.

Transport for London announced that "The 18-month project will see the flyover strengthened, the bearings underneath the structure replaced, a new carriageway drainage system [fitted] and the entire flyover waterproofed and resurfaced." The cost subsequently rose to £100 million. TfL announced on 4 September 2015 that repair work to the flyover had been completed.

== Replacement tunnel ==
The construction sector has proposed that the flyover be replaced with a tunnel. A group of architects, including Assael Architecture and Simone de Gale, ran an event as part of London Festival of Architecture in 2012 to introduce the idea and gauge public interest. Following a mixed but mostly positive response, the West London Link was set up to explore the options in more detail. Three options were presented to the public in February 2014. A template is the Alaskan Way Viaduct replacement tunnel in Seattle. The then mayor of London, Boris Johnson, added publicity to the concept. In February 2015 Johnson suggested a toll charge might be needed to cover the estimated £1.5 billion cost of building the tunnel.

== See also ==
- List of bridges in London
