= Gary Hibbs =

English footballer

Personal information
- Full name: Gary Thomas Hibbs
- Date of birth: 26 January 1957 (age 69)
- Place of birth: Hammersmith, England
- Position: Midfielder

Senior career*
Years	Team	Apps	(Gls)
1975–1976	Orient	1	(0)
1976–1977	Aldershot	6	(0)
- * Club domestic league appearances and goals

Gary Thomas Hibbs (born 26 January 1957) is an English former professional footballer who played in the Football League as a midfielder.
