= The Hop Poles =

Pub in Hammersmith, London

Coordinates: 51°29′34″N 0°13′33″W

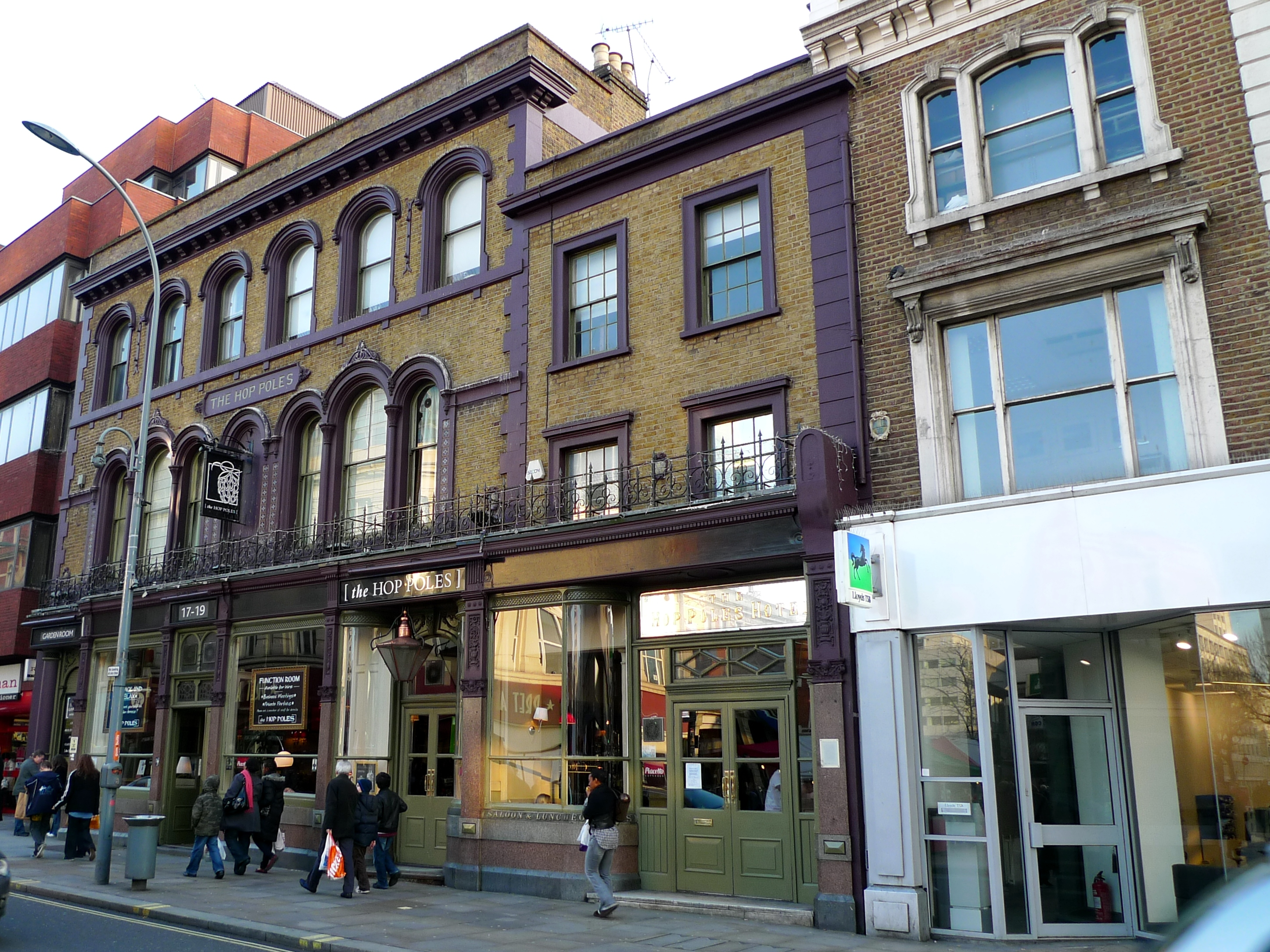
The Hop Poles

The Hop Poles is a Grade II listed public house at 17–19 King Street, Hammersmith, London.

It was built in 1857, the amalgamation of two earlier houses, and the architect is not known".
