= Hammersmith Parish Act 1834 =

Act of the Parliament of the United Kingdom

- Act of Parliament
- Parliament of the United Kingdom
- Long title: An act for making the Hamlet of Hammersmith, within the Parish of Fulham in the County of Middlesex, a distinct and separate Parish, and for converting the Perpetual Curacy of the Church of Saint Paul Hammersmith into a Vicarage, and for the Endowment thereof.
- Citation: 4 & 5 Will. 4. c. lxxv
- Territorial extent: United Kingdom

Dates
- Royal assent: 27 June 1834
- Commencement: 27 June 1834 (Note: Section 1.)
- Repealed: 1 April 1965

Other legislation
- Repealed by: London Government Act 1963

Status: Repealed

Text of statute as originally enacted

The Hammersmith Parish Act 1834 (4 & 5 Will. 4. c. lxxv) was a local act of the Parliament of the United Kingdom that established the parish of Hammersmith, separate from the parish of Fulham.

== Background ==
Hammersmith was originally a hamlet within the parish of Fulham.

In 1629, inhabitants of Hammersmith, including the Earl of Mulgrave and Nicholas Crispe, successfully petitioned the Bishop of London for a chapel of ease to be built at St Paul's, Church, in Hammersmith.

On 7 June 1631, the chapelry was consecrated by Bishop Laud. A perpetual curacy was established and the chapelry developed its own independent vestry.

== Provisions ==
The act enacted that, on the passing of the act:

- The Hamlet of Hammersmith should become a distinct parish for all parochial purposes, named Hammersmith Parish.
- The Church of Saint Paul should be the parish church, vested in the Vicar of Hammersmith for the time being and his successors forever, with the perpetual curacy converted into a vicarage and Francis Thomas Atwood as the new Vicar of Hammersmith.

== Legacy ==
The whole act was repealed by the London Government Act 1963, which created Greater London and a new local government structure within it.
