= King Street, Hammersmith =

Street in Hammersmith, London

King Street
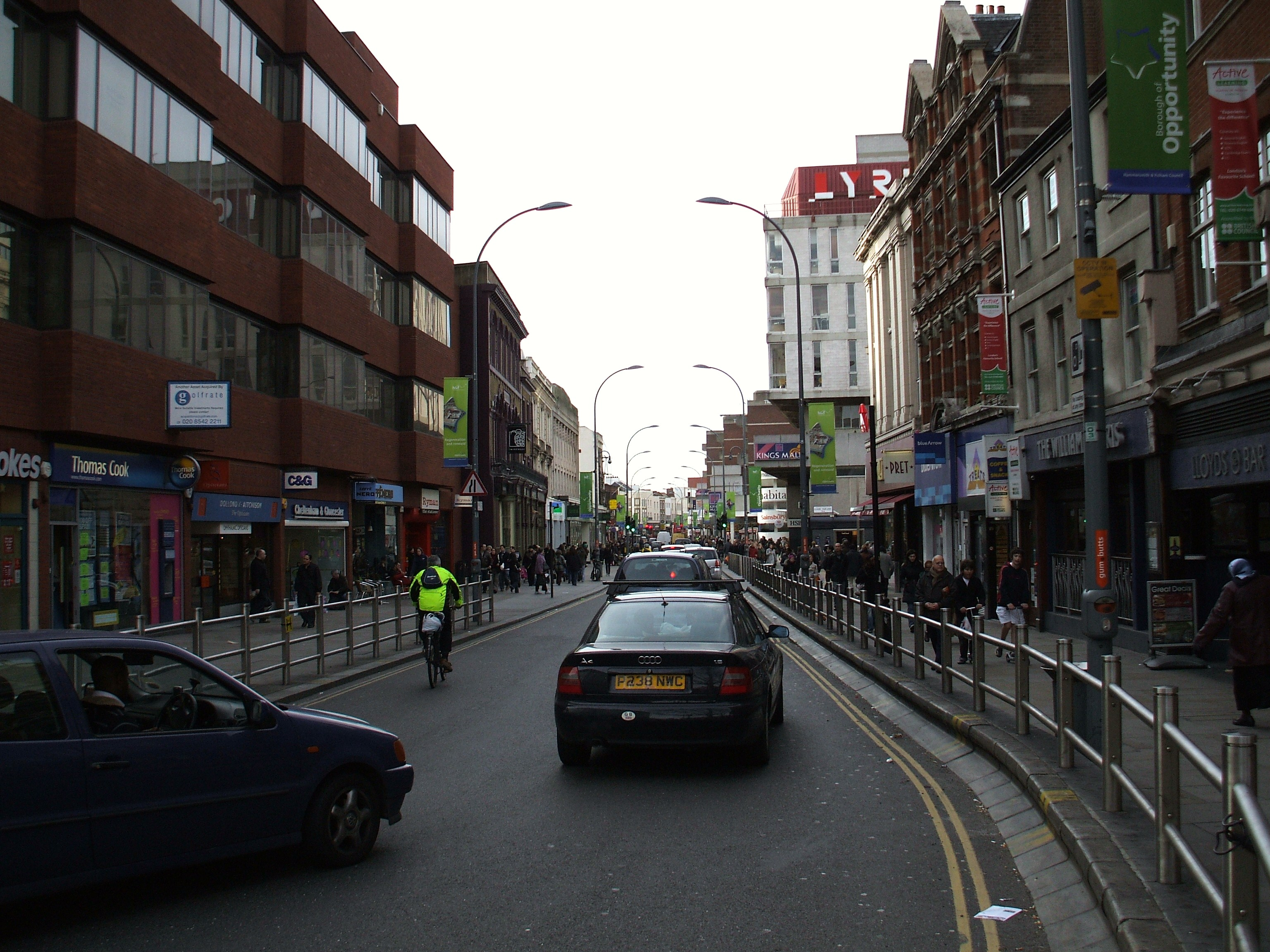
- Shops on King Street
- Interactive map of King Street
- Part of: A402
- Namesake: John King
- Length: 1.5 mi (2.4 km)
- Area: Hammersmith
- Location: West London
- Coordinates: 51°29′34.55″N 0°14′06.87″W

King Street, Hammersmith is the main shopping street in Hammersmith, London. It runs west–east, and forms part of the A315, and is the eastern continuation of Chiswick High Road, where it meets Goldhawk Road (the A402), close to Stamford Brook tube station. At the eastern end it meets Hammersmith Broadway and continues east as Hammersmith Road where it forms a crossroads with the A219, the Shepherd's Bush Road running northwards, and the Fulham Palace Road running south.

The street is two-way along its western part, and one-way westbound along its eastern part. Eastbound traffic uses Studland Street, Glenthorne Road and Beadon Road.

== History ==
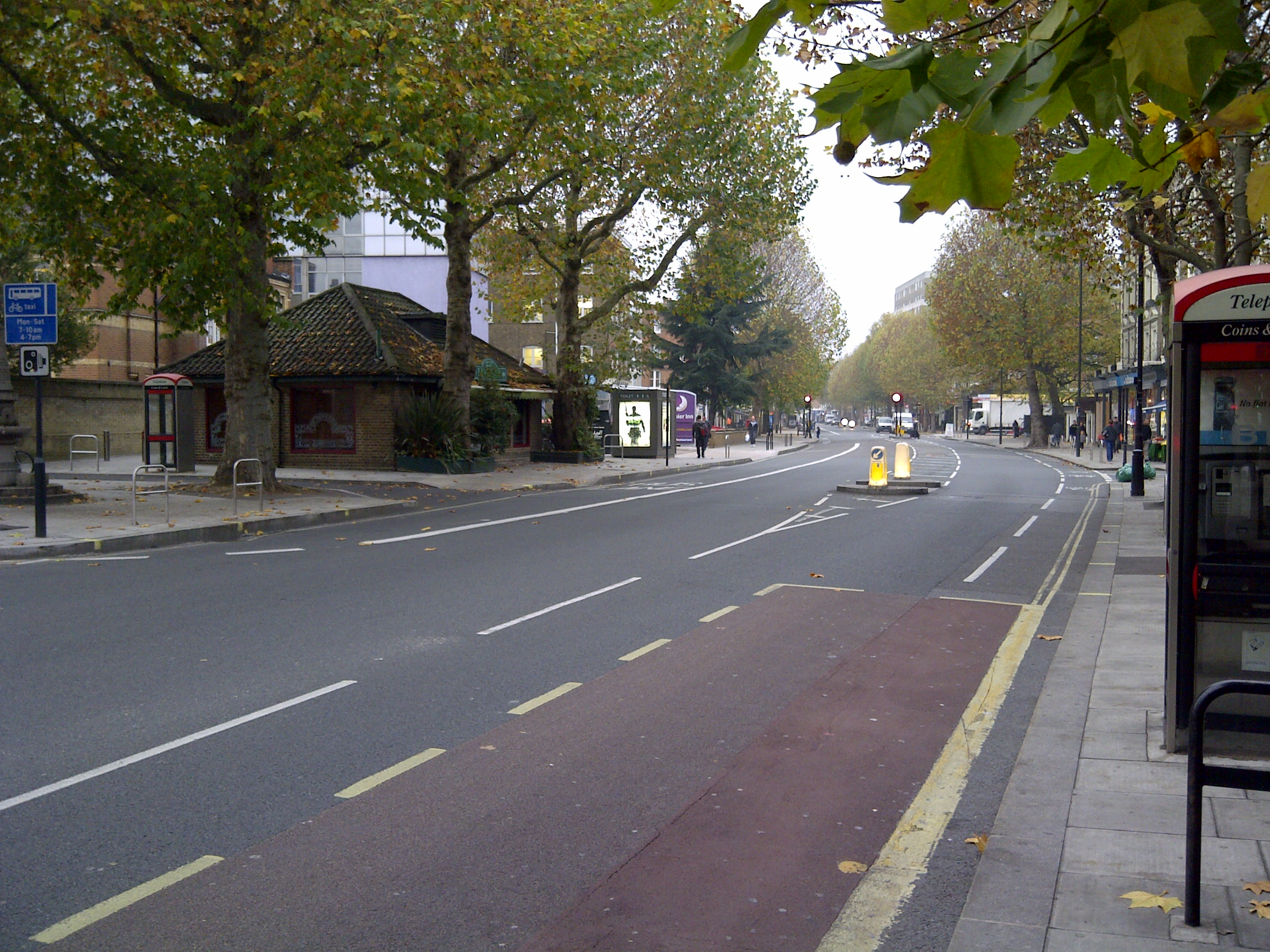
King Street in Hammersmith, looking west

Despite the name, and its proximity to Queen Caroline Street, the street is not named after any monarch of England or otherwise; it is named after John King, Bishop of London, who gave land to the poor of Fulham in 1620.

The street is about a mile and a half long and formerly had several posting houses, as it was the road to Windsor, which have now become pubs. It has long been the principal street of Hammersmith.

On 26 January 2018, a water main in King Street burst, flooding the street. 70 people were led to safety by the London Fire Brigade.

== Notable buildings ==
Several of the pubs along King Street are listed buildings, including The Salutation and The Hop Poles.

On the north side, there is the Livat Hammersmith shopping centre (formerly known as Kings Mall) with over 40 shops and eating places.

Also on the north side, at Nos. 238–246, is the Polish Social and Cultural Association, popularly known as the "POSK", which has been the centre of the Polish community in London since the 1960s. Further to the west is the main south entrance to Ravenscourt Park, which is a memorial gate to Sir William Bull, a former MP for Hammersmith.

On the south side of King Street is Hammersmith Town Hall. Originally set further back from the street, in the 1970s a huge concrete extension was built facing the street, on the site of a former park, to accommodate offices. In 2013 the go-ahead was given to demolish the 'eyesore' and replace it with a new green space and homes.

Also on the south side of King Street is Rivercourt Methodist Church, built in 1875 by Charles Bell. Next door, at No. 237, is Latymer Upper School, a co-educational independent school, founded in 1895 and the descendant of a school founded in the seventeenth century by Edward Latymer who, by his will, dated 1624, bequeathed thirty-five acres of land in Hammersmith, "the profits of which were to be appropriated to clothing six poor men, clothing and educating six poor boys, and distributing in money." Toby Young's West London Free School in Pallingswick House sits on the corner of King Street and Weltje Road.

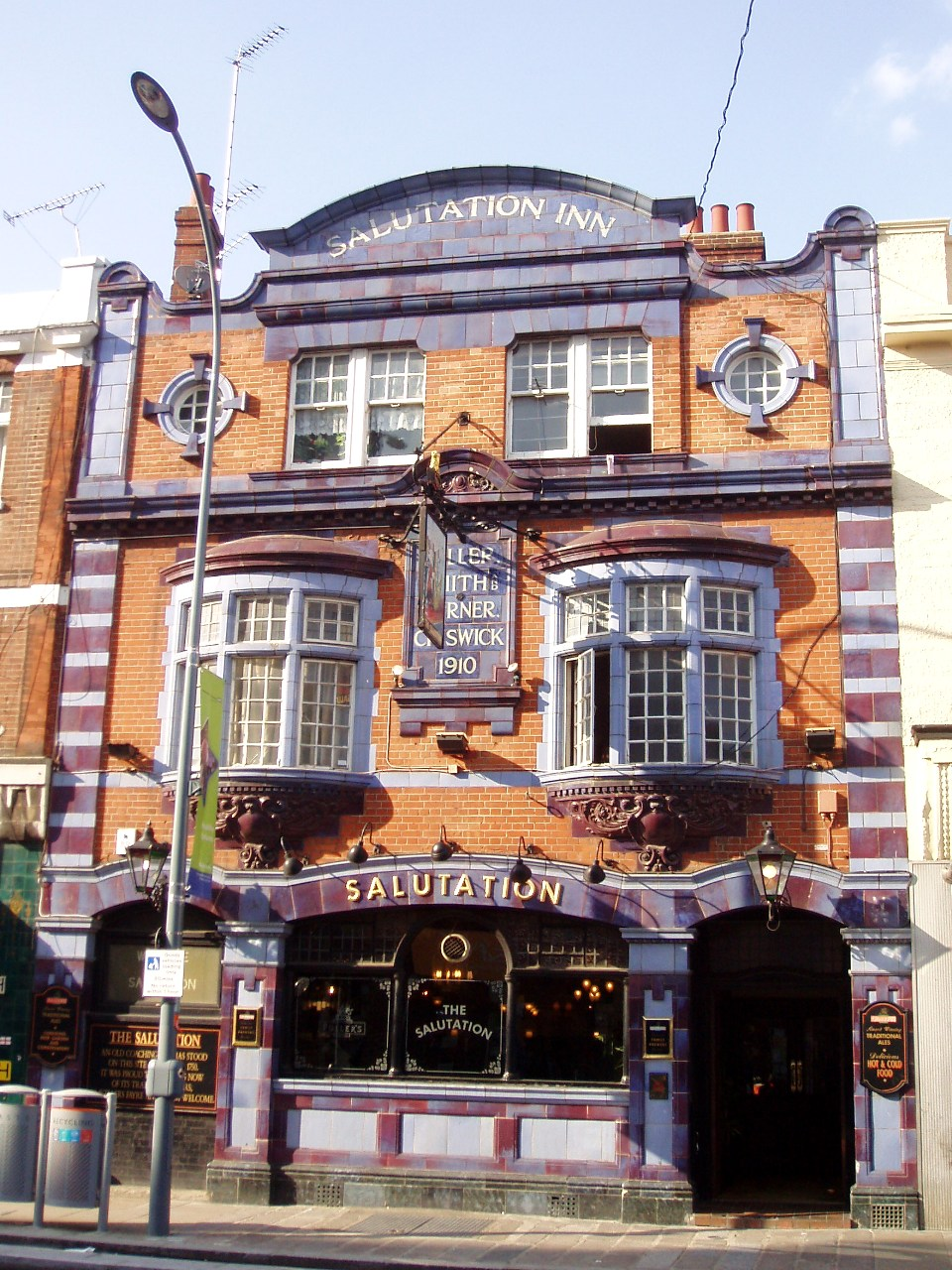
The Salutation

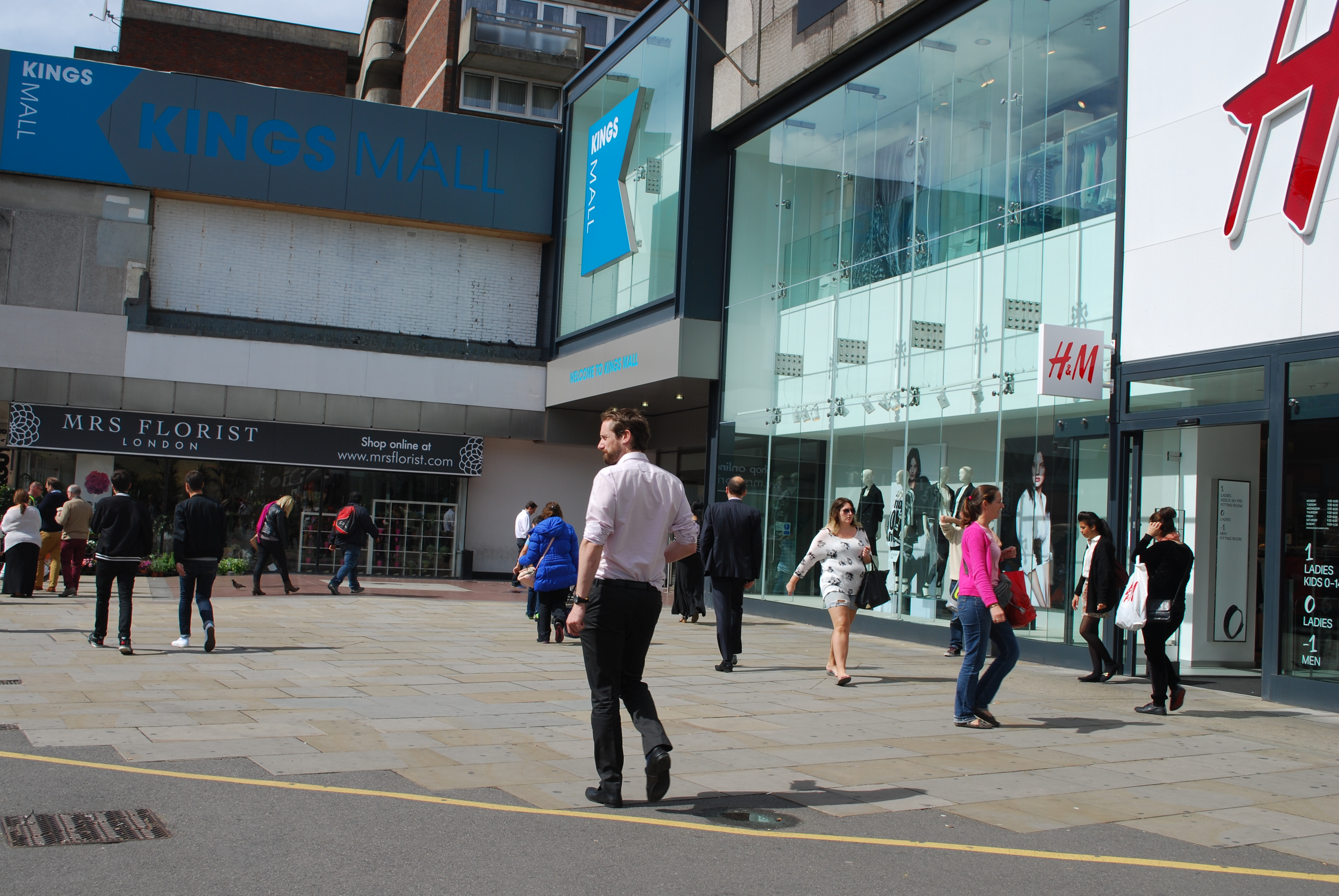
Kings Mall shopping centre

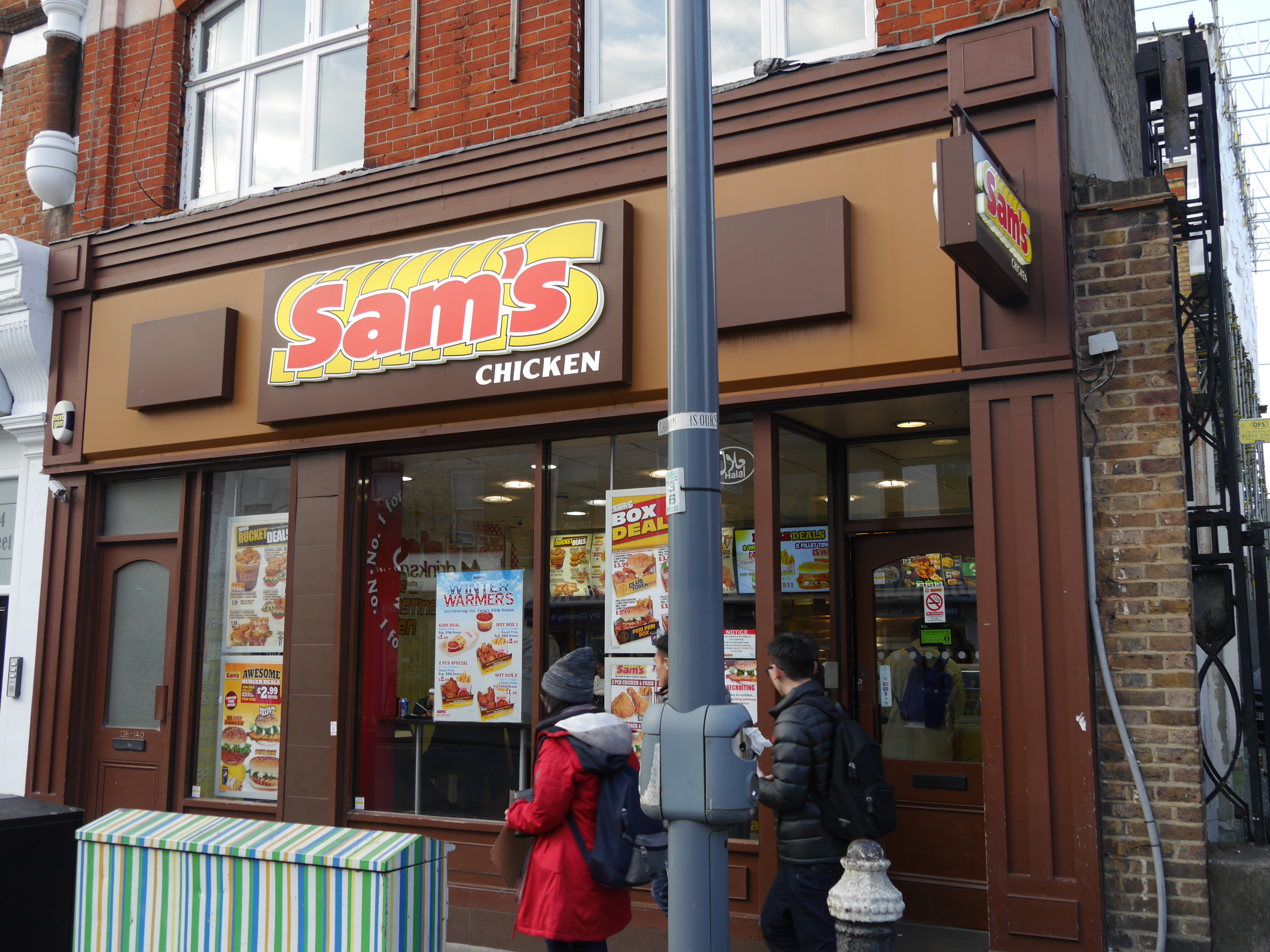
Sam's Chicken, King Street, Hammersmith

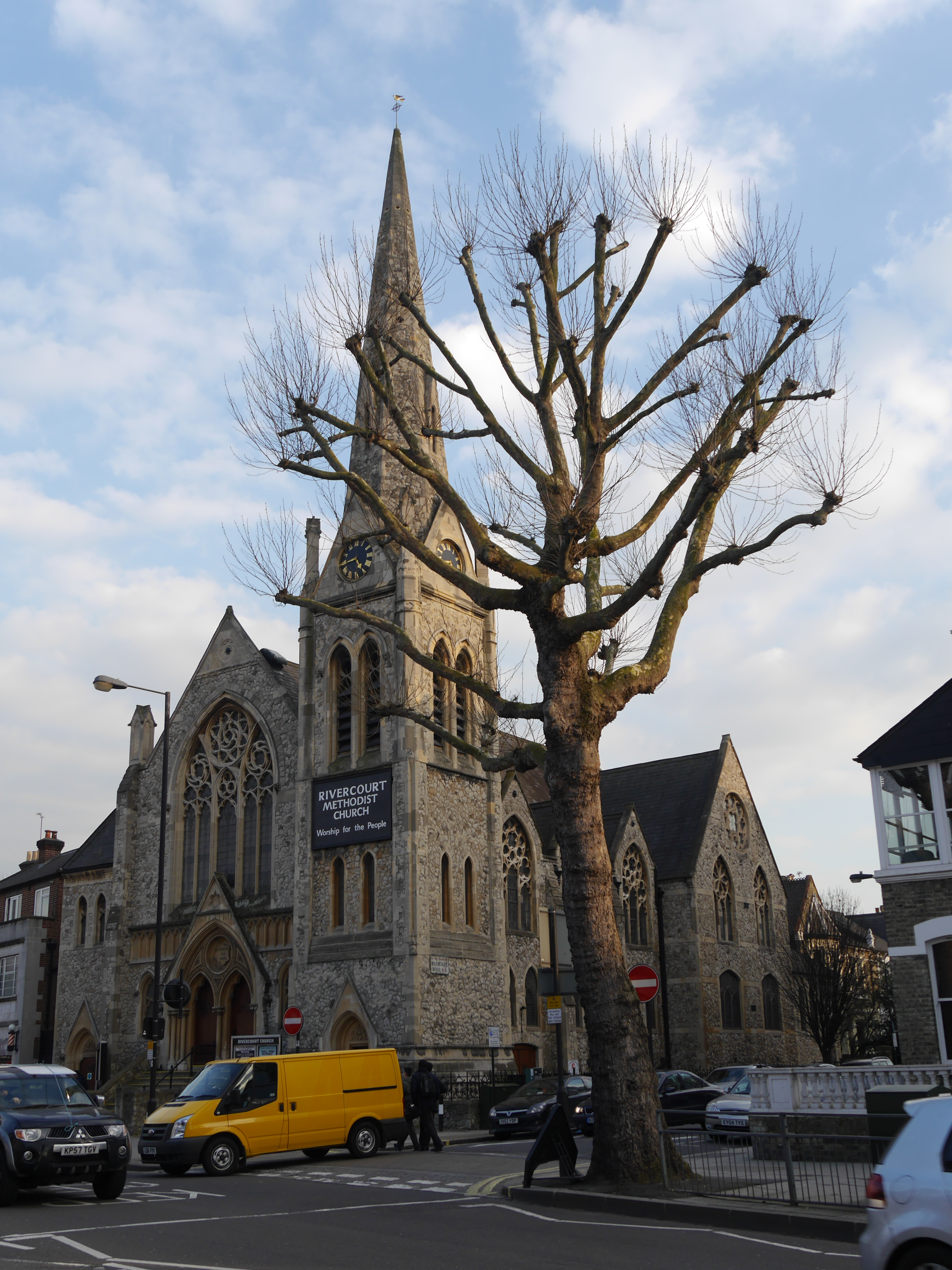
Rivercourt Methodist Church

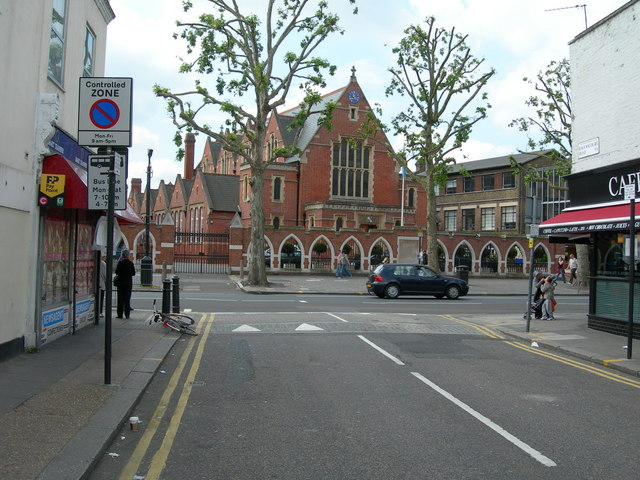
Latymer Upper School

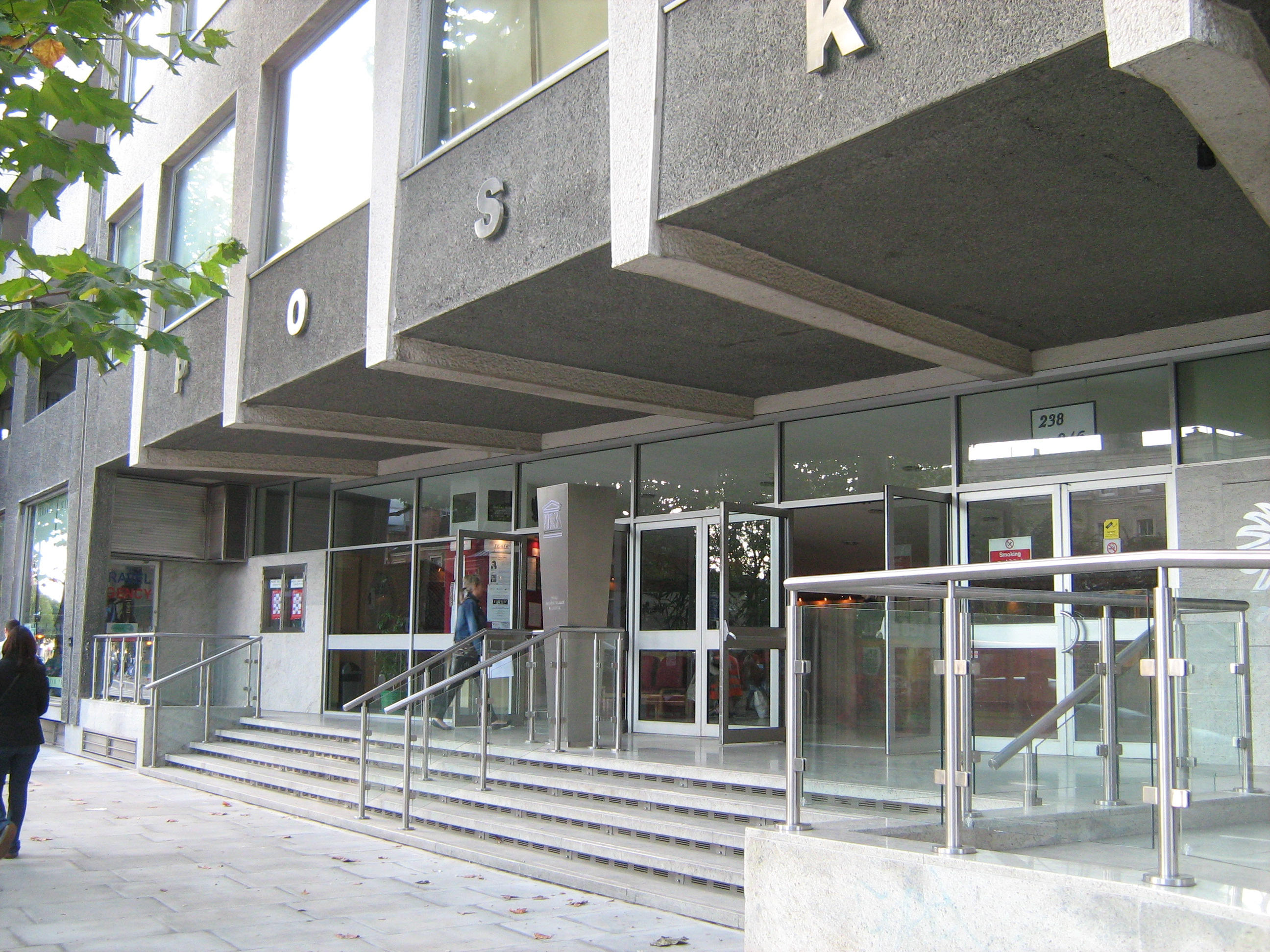
The Polish Social and Cultural Association in London

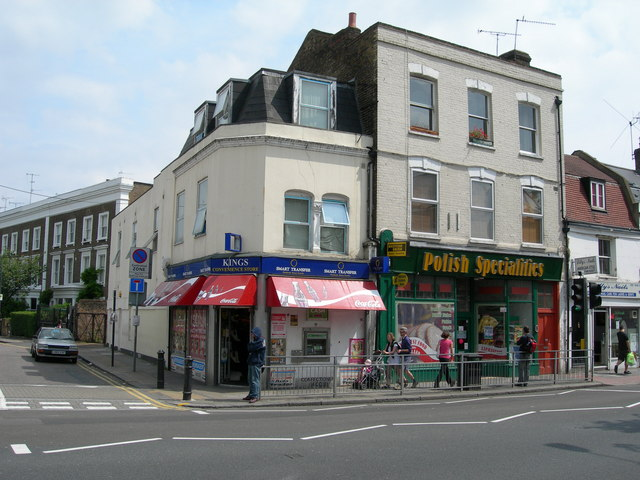
A corner shop alongside a Polish shop

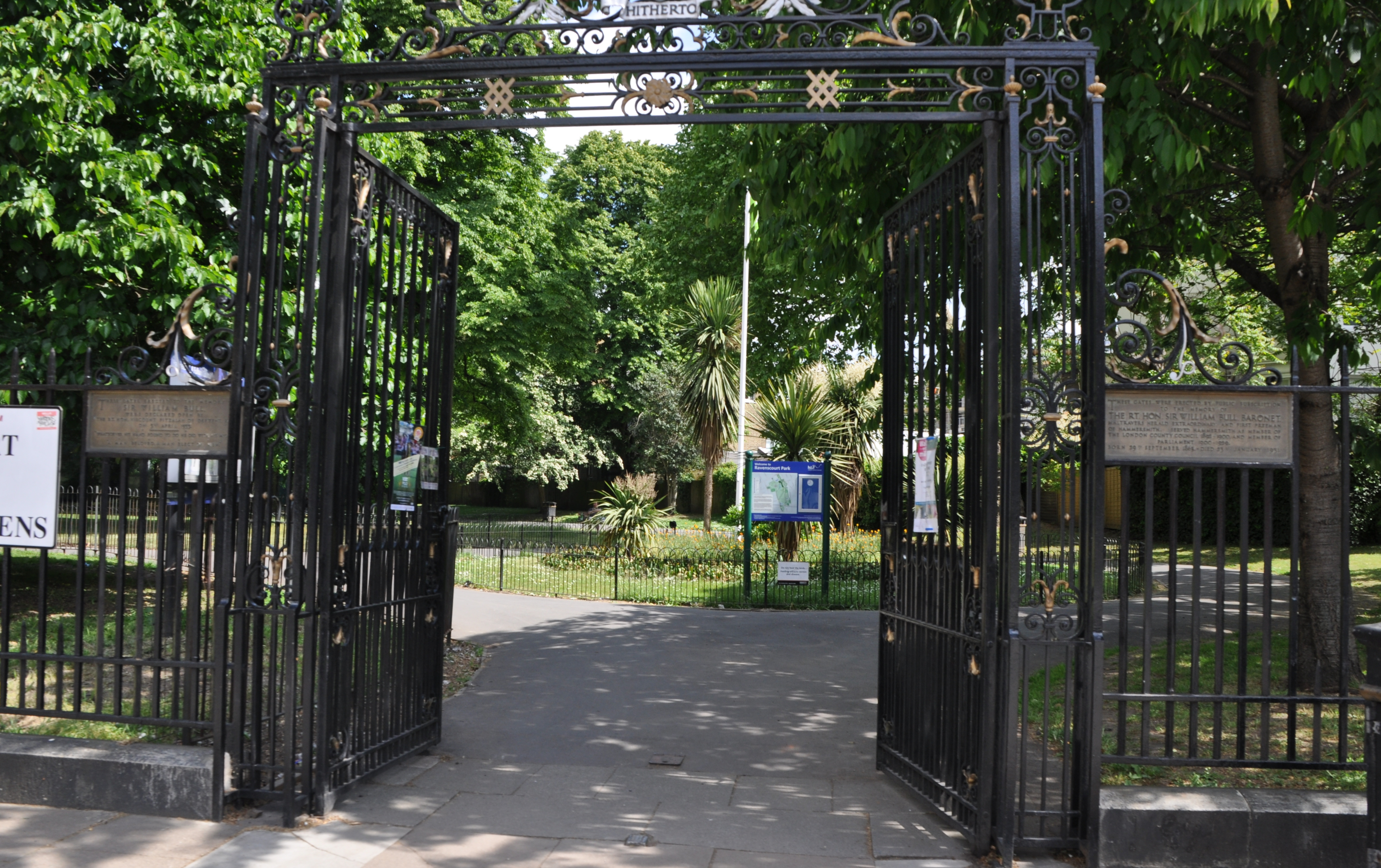
Gate into Ravenscourt Park on King Street
