= Hammersmith (Holst) =

1930 wind band composition by Gustav Holst

- Prelude and Scherzo
- Wind band work by Gustav Holst
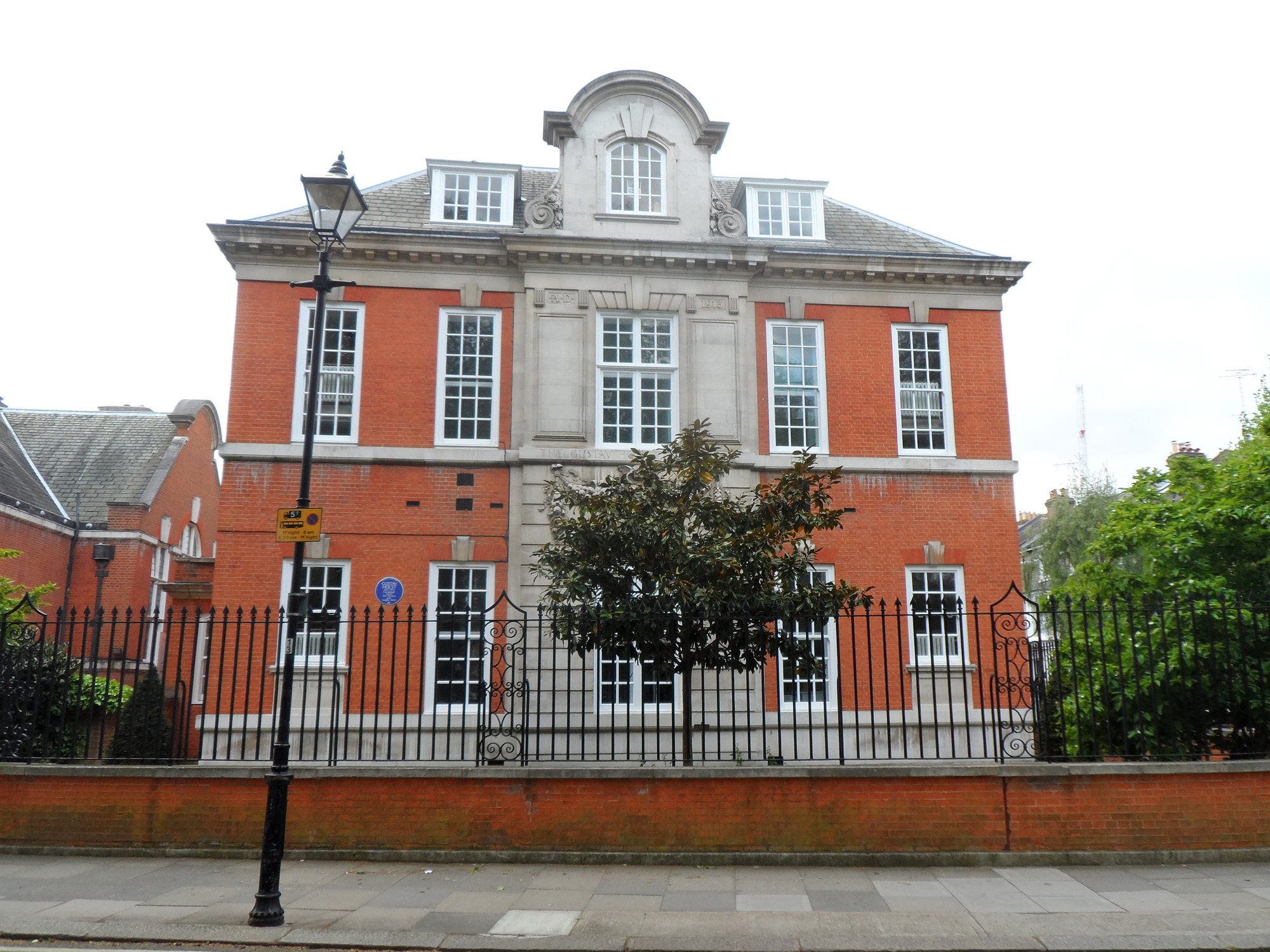
- St Paul's Girls' School in London, where Holst composed the work
- Key: F minor
- Opus: 52
- Year: 1930
- Period: Early 20th century
- Form: Wind band
- Commissioned by: BBC Military Band
- Dedication: To the author of The Water Gypsies
- Duration: 14 minutes

Premiere
- Date: 17 April 1932
- Location: Washington, D.C.
- Conductor: Taylor Branson
- Performers: United States Marine Band

Hammersmith: Prelude and Scherzo, more commonly known as just Hammersmith, Op. 52, is a wind band work composed by English composer Gustav Holst in 1930, with a corresponding orchestral version. Commissioned by the BBC Military Band, the piece is based on Holst's love for the London borough of Hammersmith. The writing is more musically challenging than Holst's other wind band works, and is a wind band essential today. A typical performance runs for 14 minutes.

== History ==
=== Composition and inspiration ===
Holst was commissioned to compose the work by the BBC Military Band in 1930, and he finished the work that same year. It was Holst's first wind band work after 19 years, his last being the Second Suite in F for Military Band. Holst also orchestrated a version for a full orchestra in 1931. The piece is based on Holst's love for the London borough of Hammersmith. Imogen Holst, Gustav Holst's daughter, writes in her biography of Gustav:

Those who knew nothing of this forty-year-old affection for the Hammersmith district of London were puzzled at the title ... Its mood is the outcome of long years of familiarity with the changing crowds and the changing river: those Saturday night crowds, who were always good-natured even when they were being pushed off the pavement into the middle of the traffic ... As for the river, he had known it since he was a student ... In Hammersmith the river is the background to the crowd: it is a river that goes on its way unnoticed and unconcerned.

=== Performances ===
Hammersmith's premiere was performed by the United States Marine Band at the American Bandmasters Association Convention in Washington, D.C., in 1932. This was the only performance of the wind band version of the work during Holst's lifetime. The orchestral version, published by Boosey & Hawkes, remained in print, but the band version was completely lost after Holst's death in 1934. In 1954, Robert Cantrick, the band director at the Carnegie Institute of Technology, worked with Imogen Holst to reassemble the complete parts after Imogen Holst found the original manuscript. The second performance was given by the Kiltie Band under Cantrick on 14 April 1954, upon which Boosey & Hawkes published it. Since then, Hammersmith has gained widespread recognition, and is considered a professional band essential today.

The orchestral version of the work was unlucky in being premiered at the 1931 concert that also featured the London premiere of Walton's Belshazzar's Feast, by which it was somewhat overshadowed. It has been performed twice at the BBC Proms, the more recent being in the 2024 season.

== Instrumentation ==
=== Band Version ===
The band version is orchestrated for a military band.

Woodwinds 2 flutes 2 E♭ clarinets (2nd optional) 2 oboes (2nd optional) Solo B♭ clarinet 3 B♭ clarinets E♭ alto saxophone B♭ tenor saxophone 2 bassoons (2nd optional)	Brass 4 French horns in F (3rd and 4th optional) Solo B♭ cornet 2 cornets 2 trumpets 3 trombones Baritone Basses (divided a2)	Percussion Timpani Snare drum Bass drum Cymbals Glockenspiel Xylophone Gong Triangle

=== Orchestral version ===
The orchestral version is orchestrated for a symphony orchestra.

Woodwinds
2 flutes and piccolo
2 oboes
Cor anglais
Clarinet in A
Clarinet in B♭
Bass clarinet in B♭
2 bassoons
Double bassoon

Brass
4 horns in F
3 trumpets in C
2 tenor trombones
Bass trombone
Tuba

Percussion
Timpani
Bass drum
Cymbals
Triangle
Xylophone
Gong

Strings
Violins
Violas
Cellos
Basses

== Music ==
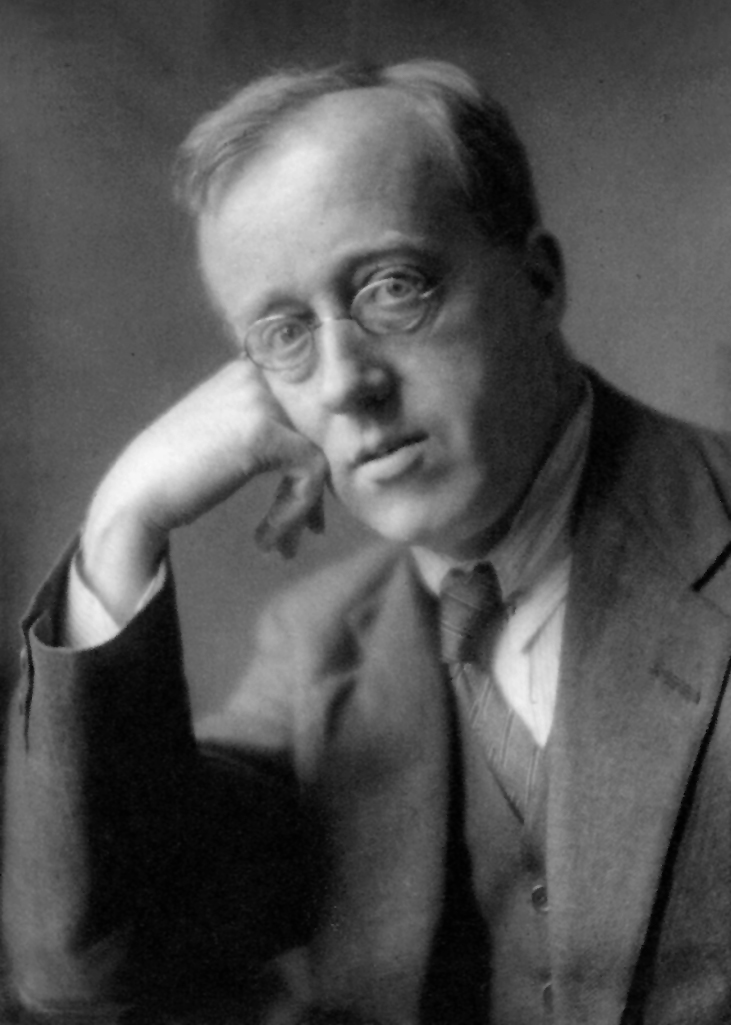
Gustav Holst, composer of Hammersmith

Hammersmith begins in F minor and 4/2 time. It opens with a Prelude section, marked poco adagio, a deep bass ostinato repeating throughout.

Cantrick described the first theme; "As this figure begins its manifold repetitions, horns above it softly unfold a long-breathed cantilena... flutes and bassoons take over the cantilena." The meter changes to 3/2 and changes key to C major, then moves into the second section, the Scherzo section, marked vivace in 2/4. The second theme begins in the flutes. Multiple new themes continue to be introduced as the original flute theme is played underneath. Halfway through this section, the meter in the woodwinds (excluding bassoon and tenor sax) changes to 6/8, and the remainder of the instruments stay in 2/4.

The music returns to a slow section, marked meno mosso. Cantrick writes, "floating out of nowhere in the middle reeds and passing on down to the horns, the long-breathed cantilena of the Prelude returns, flooding out everything else." The ostinato in the bass returns, the tempo now molto adagio. The first theme from the Scherzo returns, played one after the other by solo woodwinds. The cantilena is reintroduced in the horns; the bass ostinato fades out into silence.

== Reception ==
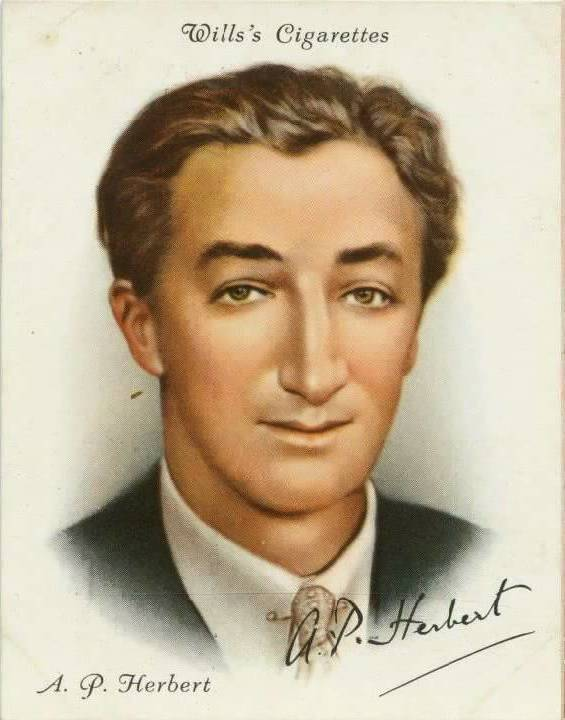
A. P. Herbert, dedicatee of Hammersmith.

The piece was dedicated "To the author of The Water Gypsies", the humorist and politician A. P. Herbert, who reflected upon his life along the British waterways in the novel.

As the work was unplayed after its premiere until 1954, there are no known reviews from immediately after the composition of the work. After Cantrick unearthed the work, numerous reviews were released as the work was recorded and broadcast. Murray Carmack wrote in The Musical Times in 1963:

I heard it once, in a BBC broadcast, and thought it a fine work; and think so again reading this score in which the brilliant boisterous pages are controlled by a keen, clear intelligence; and the prelude, central episode and coda evoke, so beautifully, a solitude and peace that can be found in the heart of London's bustle.

Frederick Fennell remarked that, "Hammersmith still represents some of the most treacherous stretches of music making in all of the band's literature."

== Discography ==
=== Band Version ===
- Timothy Reynish with the Royal Northern College of Music Wind Orchestra (Chandos, 1999)
- Frederick Fennell with the United States Marine Band (Altissimo, 2008)
- John P. Lynch with the University of Georgia Wind Ensemble (Naxos, 2009)
- Howard Dunn with the Dallas Wind Symphony (Reference Recordings, 2012)
- David Lloyd-Jones with the wind and brass of the Royal Scottish National Orchestra (Naxos, 1998)

=== Orchestra version ===
- Sir Adrian Boult with the London Symphony Orchestra (Lyrita, 1992)
- Richard Hickox with the London Symphony Orchestra (Chandos, 1996)
