= Cambridge Grove =

Coordinates: 34.04585°N 84.56649°W

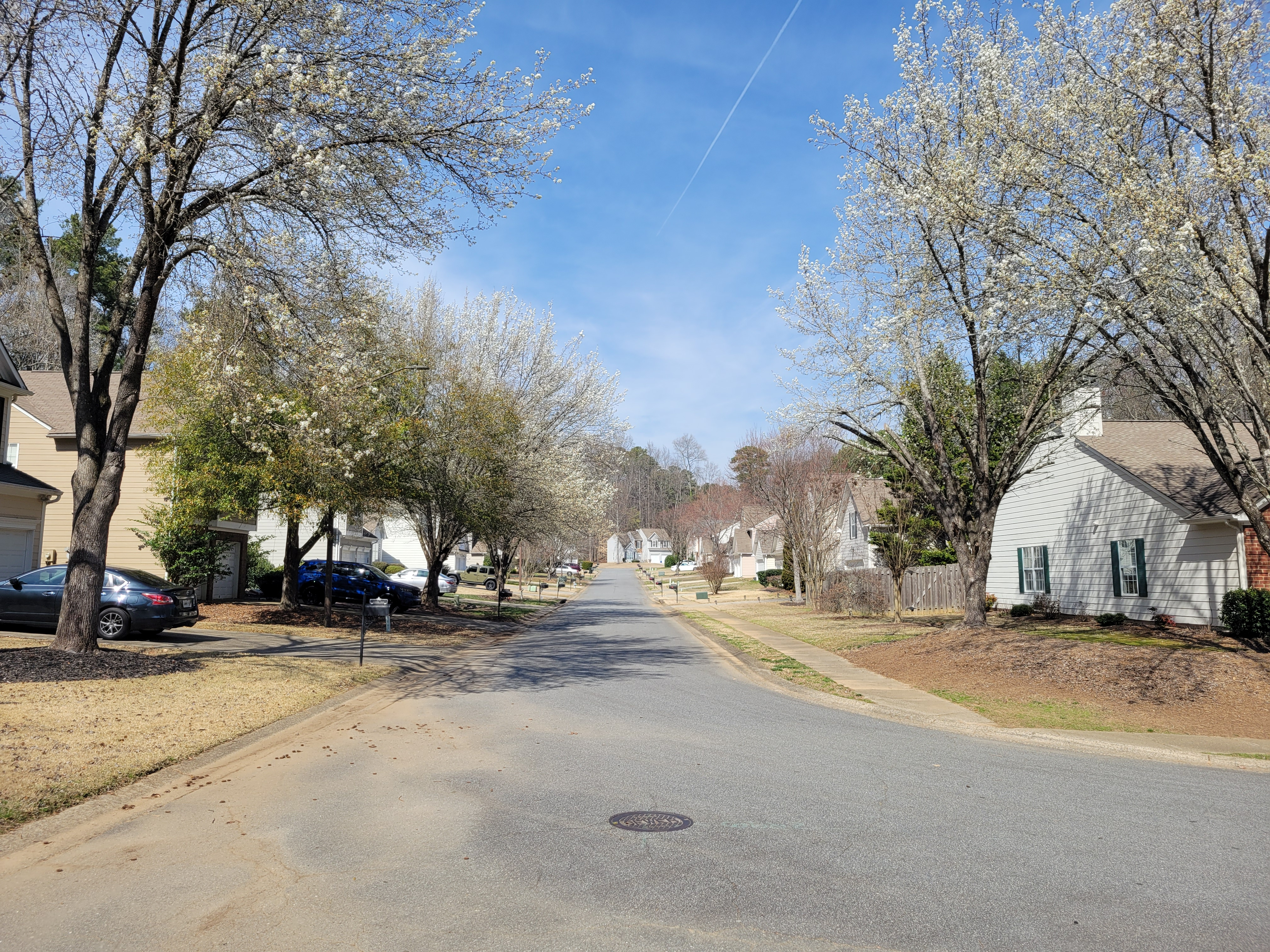
Ethridge Drive

Cambridge Grove is a neighborhood established in 1996. It is located in the northern part of Cobb County, Georgia, off North Booth Road. It is a small subdivision with 156 single family homes. It is a swim & tennis community with a homeowner association. Cambridge Grove is in walking distance to Chalker Elementary School and Palmer Middle School.

== Schools ==
Cambridge Grove is in the Cobb County School District.

Elementary school: Chalker Elementary School
Middle school: Palmer Middle School
High school: Kell High School
