= Hammersmith =

District of London, England

Coordinates: 51°29′36″N 0°13′22″W

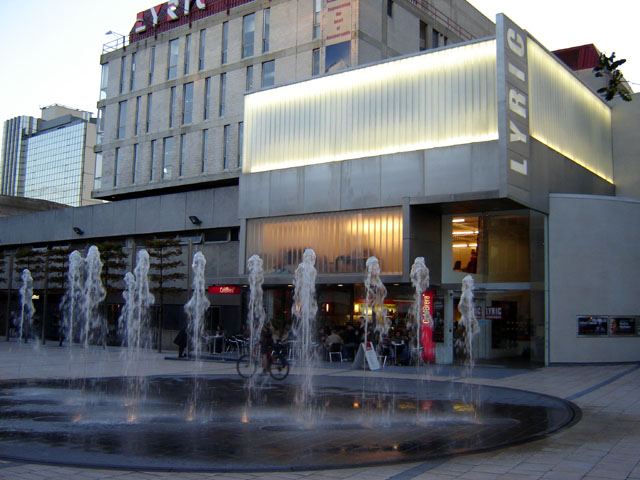
- Lyric Theatre, and the fountains in Lyric Square

- Location within Greater London
- Population: 95,996 (2020)
- OS grid reference: TQ233786
  - Charing Cross: 4.3 mi (6.9 km) ENE
- London borough: Hammersmith & Fulham
- Ceremonial county: Greater London
- Region: London
- Country: England
- Sovereign state: United Kingdom
- Post town: LONDON
- Postcode district: W6, W14
- Dialling code: 020
- Police: Metropolitan
- Fire: London
- Ambulance: London
- UK Parliament: Hammersmith and Chiswick
- London Assembly: West Central

Hammersmith is a district of West London, England, 4.3 miles (6.9 km) southwest of Charing Cross. It is the administrative centre of the London Borough of Hammersmith and Fulham, and identified in the London Plan as one of 35 major centres in Greater London.

It is bordered by Shepherd's Bush to the north, Kensington to the east, Chiswick to the west, and Fulham to the south, all on the north bank of the River Thames. The area is one of west London's main commercial and employment centres, and has for some decades been a major centre of London's Polish community. It is a major transport hub for west London, with two London Underground stations and a bus and coach station at Hammersmith Broadway. Hammersmith Bridge, opened in 1827, was the first suspension bridge across the River Thames.

Famous residents of Hammersmith include the 17th century poet John Milton. It features in literature in works such as Charles Dickens's Great Expectations and William Morris's News from Nowhere. In music, it appears in Gustav Holst's Hammersmith for military band and his Brook Green Suite. In the 20th century, many actors lived in the borough.

== Toponymy ==
Hammersmith may mean "(Place with) a hammer smithy or forge", although, in 1839, Thomas Faulkner proposed that the name derived from two Old English words: Ham from ham and the remainder from hythe, alluding to Hammersmith's riverside location. In 1922, Gover proposed that the prefix was a personal name, Heahmaer or Hæmar, and stating that the suffix must be Old English from -myðe, meaning the junction of two rivers, as Hammersmith Creek merged with the Thames here. The earliest spelling is Hamersmyth in 1294, with alternative spellings of Hameresmithe in 1312, Hamyrsmyth in 1535, and Hammersmith 1675.

== History ==
=== District ===
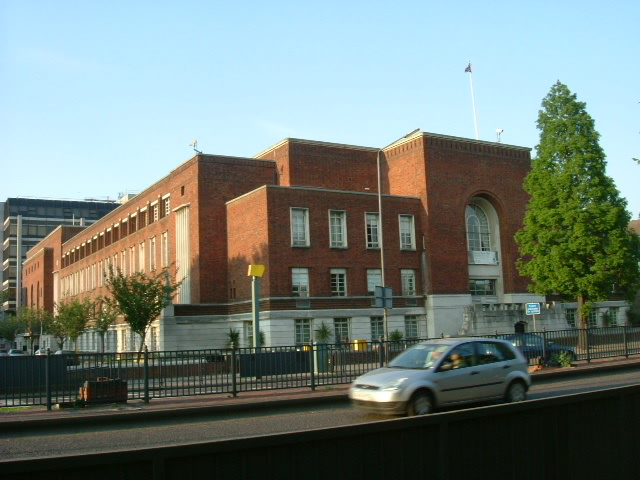
Hammersmith Town Hall, a Grade II listed building

The district was a chapelry of the ancient parish of Fulham, but became a fully independent parish in 1631. In the early 1660s, Hammersmith's first parish church, which later became St Paul's, was built by Sir Nicholas Crispe who ran the brickworks in Hammersmith. It contained a monument to Crispe as well as a bronze bust of King Charles I by Hubert Le Sueur. The church was completely rebuilt between 1882 and 1891.

In 1745, two Scots, James Lee and Lewis Kennedy, established the Vineyard Nursery, over six acres devoted to landscaping plants. During the next hundred and fifty years the nursery introduced many new plants to England, including fuchsia and the standard rose tree.

1804 saw the trial of Francis Smith for the murder of Thomas Millwood in Beaver Lane, Hammersmith. Called the Hammersmith Ghost murder case, it set a unique standard in English legal history.

In 1868, Hammersmith was the name of a parish, and of a suburban district, within the hundred of Ossulstone, in the county of Middlesex. Major industrial sites included the Osram lamp factory at Brook Green and the J. Lyons food factory (which at one time employed 30,000 people). During both World Wars, Waring & Gillow's furniture factory, in Cambridge Grove, became the site of aircraft manufacture.

Hammersmith Borough Council had provided the borough with electricity since the early twentieth century from Hammersmith power station. Upon nationalisation of the electricity industry in 1948 ownership passed to the British Electricity Authority and later to the Central Electricity Generating Board. Electricity connections to the National Grid rendered the 20 megawatt (MW) coal-fired power station redundant. It closed in 1965; in its final year of operation it delivered 5,462 MWh of electricity to the borough.

=== Parish ===
Hammersmith originated as a hamlet within the ancient parish of Fulham, with All Saints Church as the parish church. In 1629, inhabitants of Hammersmith, including the Earl of Mulgrave and Nicholas Crispe, successfully petitioned the Bishop of London for a chapel of ease to be built at St Paul's Church. On 7 June 1631, the chapelry was consecrated by Bishop Laud. A perpetual curacy was established and the chapelry developed its own independent vestry. In 1834, upon the passing of the Hammersmith Parish Act 1834 (4 & 5 Will. 4. c. lxxv), Hammersmith became a distinct parish with St Paul's as the parish church and vicarage, governed by the Hammersmith Vestry.

In 1855, following the passing of the Metropolis Management Act 1855 (18 & 19 Vict. c. 120), the parishes of Fulham and Hammersmith were combined for civil purposes as the Fulham District, governed by the Fulham District Board of Works, with 24 of the 39 members nominated by the Hammersmith Vestry. In 1873 the parish of Hammersmith was divided into three wards for the purposes of electing vestrymen. They were North (24), Centre (27) and South (21).

On 25 March 1886, following the passing of the Metropolis Management Amendment Act 1885 (48 & 49 Vict. c. 33), the Fulham District Board of Works was dissolved and vestries of Hammersmith and Fulham were incorporated, with elections to the Metropolitan Board of Works to be held on that date. On 21 March 1889, following the passing of the Local Government Act 1888 (51 & 52 Vict. c. 41), the parish transferred from the County of Middlesex to the County of London; it formed the Hammersmith constituency for elections to the London County Council, and the first election took place on 17 January 1889. In 1894 the parish was re-divided into six numbered wards.

The London Government Act 1899 (62 & 63 Vict. c. 14) reformed the administration of London by dividing the County of London into 28 metropolitan boroughs, replacing the 41 parish vestries and district boards of works administering the area. On 15 May 1900, the Metropolitan Borough of Hammersmith was created from the civil parish of Hammersmith, governed by Hammersmith Borough Council, abolishing the Hammersmith Vestry. The London Government Act 1963 created Greater London, divided into 32 London boroughs, abolishing civil parishes in London. In 1965, the parishes of Hammersmith and Fulham ceased to exist and were merged to form the London Borough of Hammersmith.

With the introduction of the New Poor Law, the parish became part of the Kensington Poor Law Union in 1837. From 1845, it was grouped with Fulham as the Fulham Poor Law Union. In 1889 Hammersmith became a single parish for poor law purposes; this lasted until the boards of guardians were abolished in 1930.

== Economy ==
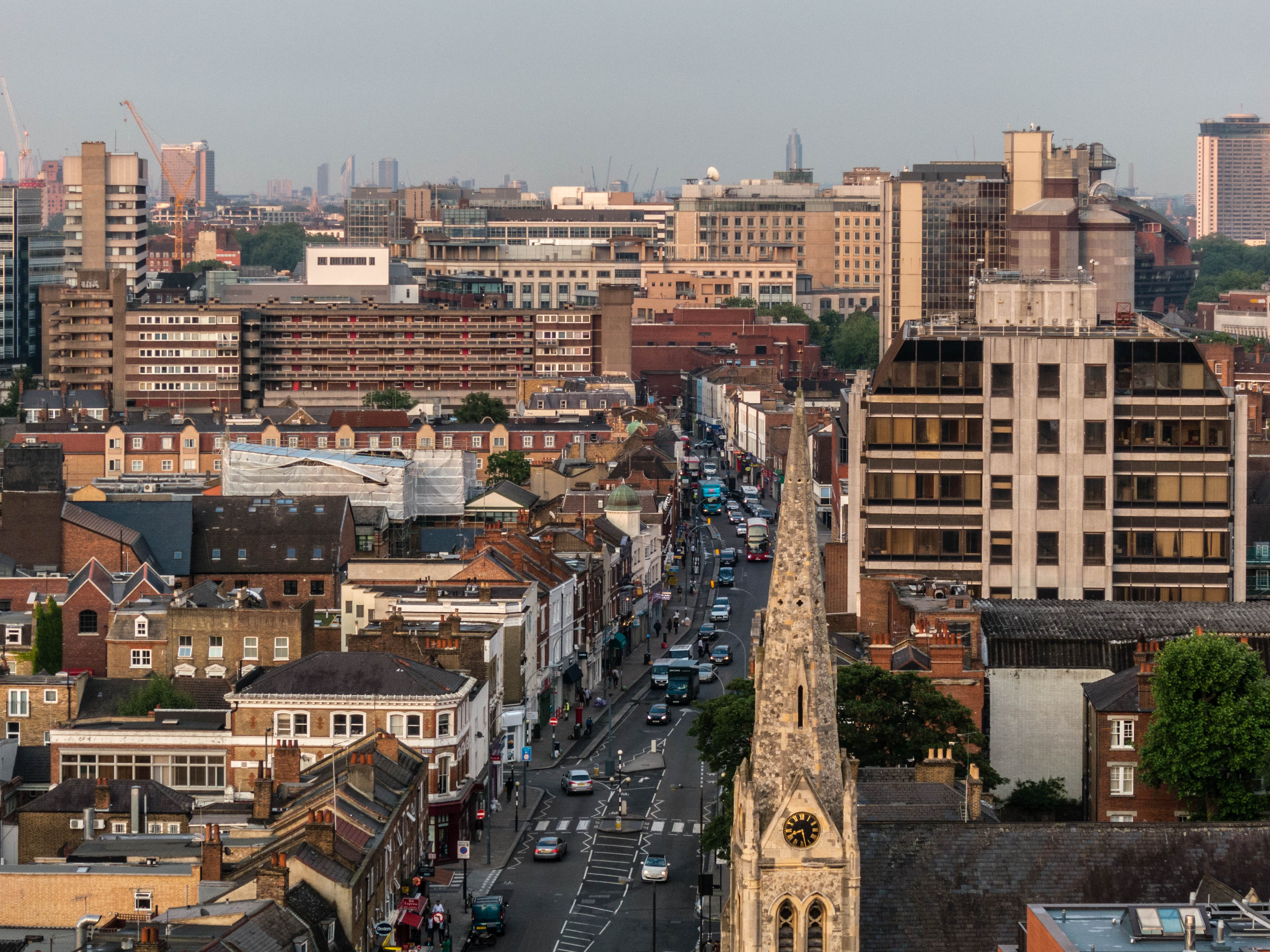
King Street

The focal point of the district is the commercial centre (the Hammersmith Broadway centre), which is located at the junction of one of the arterial routes out of central London (the A4) with several local feeder roads and a bridge over the river Thames (now closed). It houses a shopping centre, a bus station, an Underground station and an office complex.

Stretching about 750 m (820 yd) westwards from this centre is King Street, Hammersmith's main shopping street. Named after John King, Bishop of London, it contains a second shopping centre (Livat Hammersmith), the town hall, the Lyric Theatre, and the Polish community centre. To the east of the town centre is the Ark, an office complex to the south of the flyover which traverses the area.

Charing Cross Hospital on Fulham Palace Road is a large multi-disciplinary NHS hospital with accident & emergency and teaching departments run by the Imperial College School of Medicine.

== Architecture ==
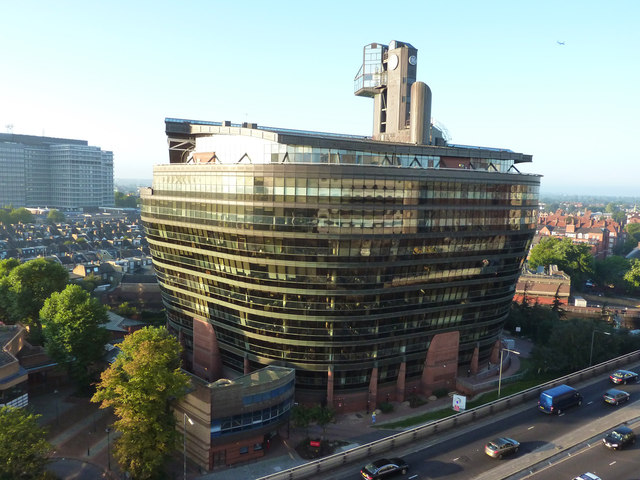
The Ark and Hammersmith flyover, carrying the A4 road westwards out of London

- "The Ark" office building, designed by British architect Ralph Erskine and completed in 1992, has some resemblance to the hull of a sailing ship.
- Hammersmith Bridge Road Surgery was designed by Guy Greenfield.
- 22 St Peter's Square, the former Royal Chiswick Laundry and Island Records HQ, has been converted to architects' studios and offices by Lifschutz Davidson Sandilands. It has a Hammersmith Society Conservation award plaque (2009) and has been included in tours in Architecture Week.
- Several of Hammersmith's pubs are listed buildings, including the Black Lion, The Dove, The George, The Hop Poles, the Hope and Anchor, the Salutation Inn and The Swan, as are Hammersmith's two parish churches, St Paul's (the town's original church, rebuilt in the 1890s) and St Peter's, built in the 1820s.

== Culture and entertainment ==
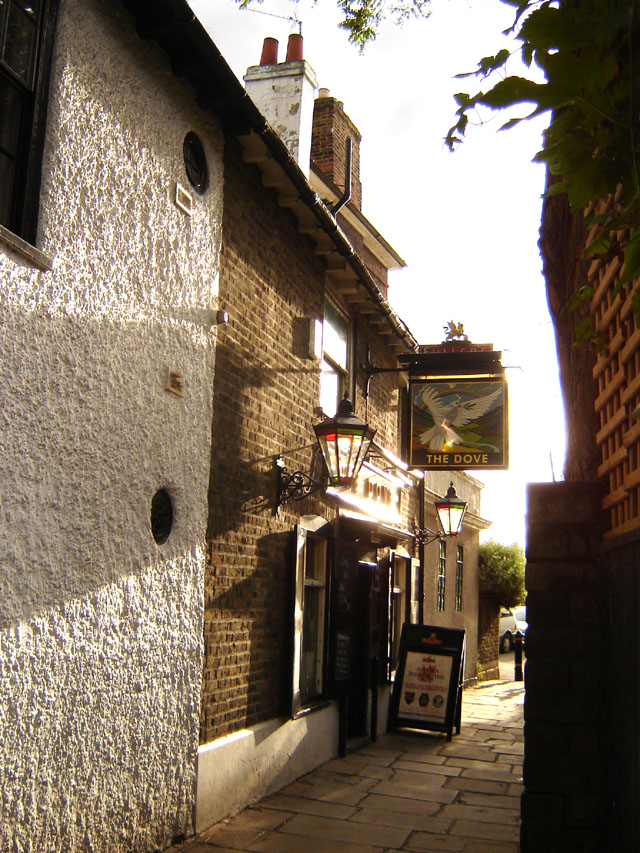
The Dove public house

Riverside Studios is a cinema, performance space, bar and café. Originally film studios, Riverside Studios were used by the BBC from 1954 to 1975 for television productions. The Lyric Hammersmith Theatre is just off King Street. Hammersmith Apollo concert hall and theatre (formerly the Carling Hammersmith Apollo, the Hammersmith Odeon, and before that the Gaumont Cinema) is just south of the gyratory. The former Hammersmith Palais nightclub has been demolished and the site reused as student accommodation. There is an Irish Cultural Centre on Black's Road. The Polish Social and Cultural Association is on King Street. It contains a theatre, an art gallery and several restaurants. Its library has one of the largest collections of Polish-language books outside Poland.

The Dove is a riverside pub with what the Guinness Book of Records listed as the smallest bar room in the world, in 2016 surviving as a small space on the right of the bar. The pub was frequented by the novelists Ernest Hemingway and Graham Greene; the poet James Thomson lodged and likely wrote Rule Britannia here. The narrow alley in which it stands is the only remnant of the riverside village of Hammersmith, the bulk of which was demolished in the 1930s. Furnivall Gardens, which lies to the east, covers the site of Hammersmith Creek and the High Bridge.

Leisure activity also takes place along Hammersmith's pedestrianised riverside, home to the pubs of Lower Mall, rowing clubs and the riverside park of Furnival Gardens. Hammersmith has a municipal park, Ravenscourt Park, to the west of the centre. Its facilities include tennis courts, a basketball court, a bowling lawn, a paddling pool, and playgrounds.

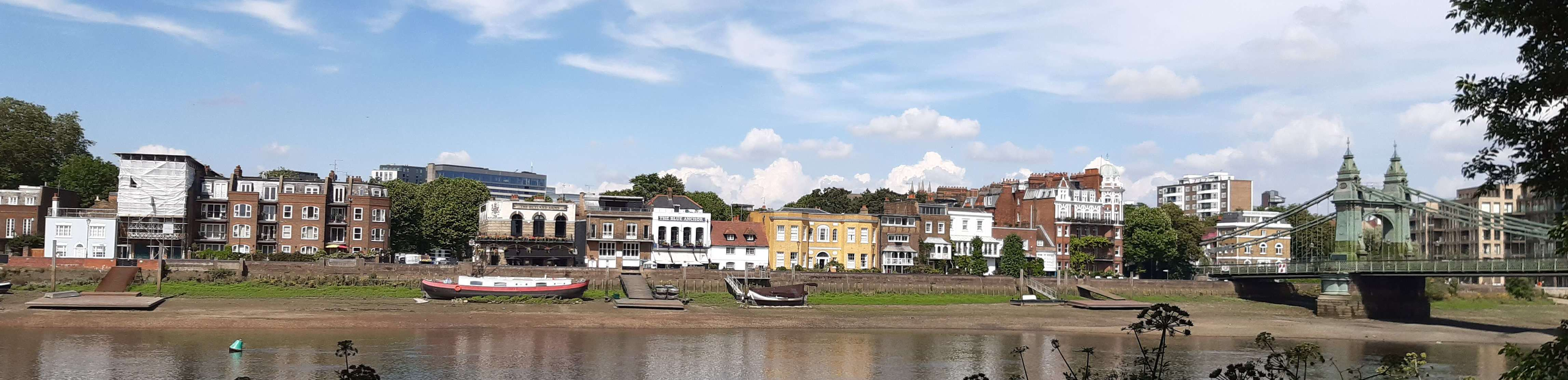
Lower Mall from the river at low tide, with Hammersmith Bridge on the right

Hammersmith is the historical home of the West London Penguin Swimming and Water Polo Club, formerly known as the Hammersmith Penguin Swimming Club. Hammersmith Chess Club has been active in the borough since it was formed in 1962. It was initially based in Westcott Lodge, later moving to St Paul's Church, then to Blythe House and now Lytton Hall, near West Kensington tube station.

== Transport ==
The area is on the main A4 trunk road heading west from central London towards the M4 motorway and Heathrow Airport. The A4, a busy commuter route, passes over the area's main road junction, Hammersmith Gyratory System, on a long viaduct, the Hammersmith Flyover. Hammersmith Bridge closed in August 2020 to pedestrians, cyclists and road traffic, severing the link with Barnes in the southwest. Its cast iron pedestals that hold the suspension system in place had become unsafe.

The centre of Hammersmith is served by two London Underground stations named Hammersmith: one is served by the Hammersmith & City and Circle lines and the other, in the Broadway shopping centre, is served by the Piccadilly and District lines, and it houses a major bus station.

== Hammersmith Bridge ==
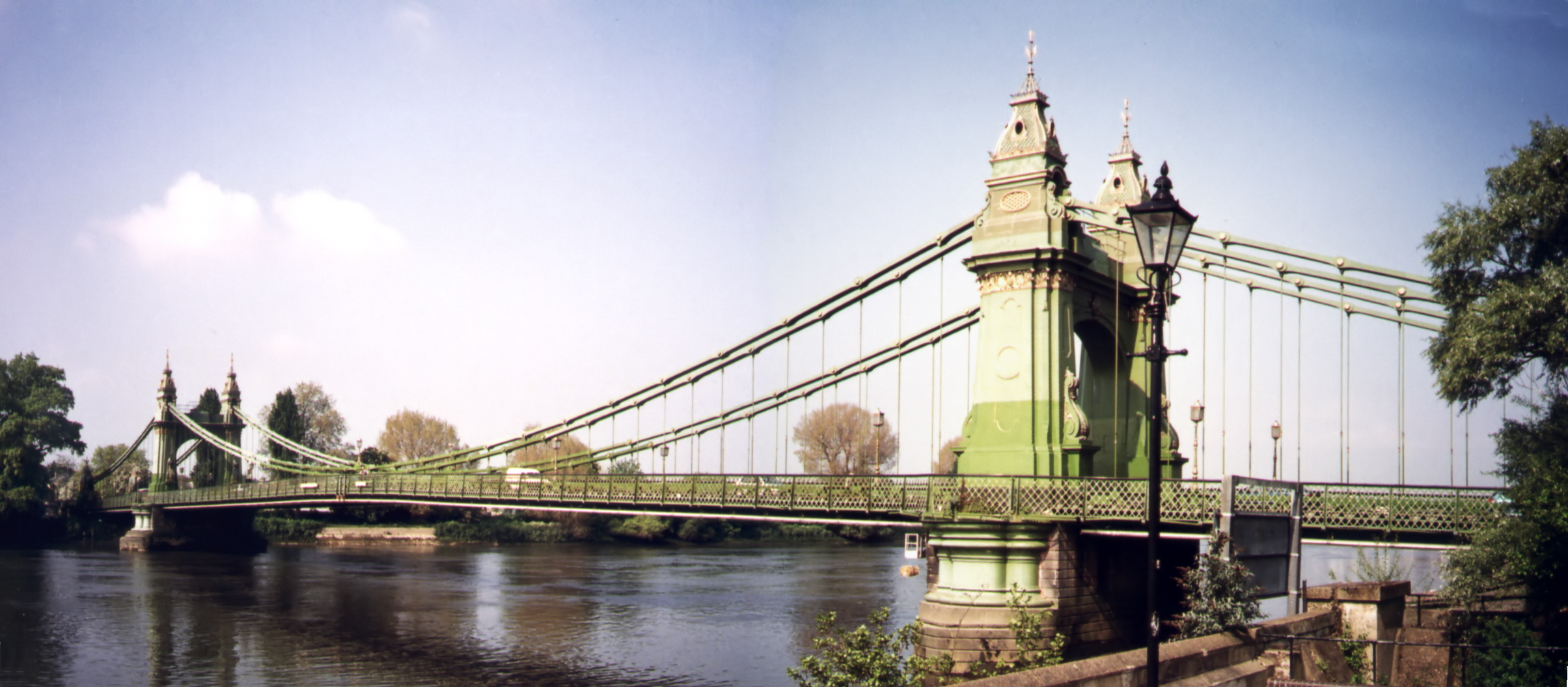
Hammersmith Bridge

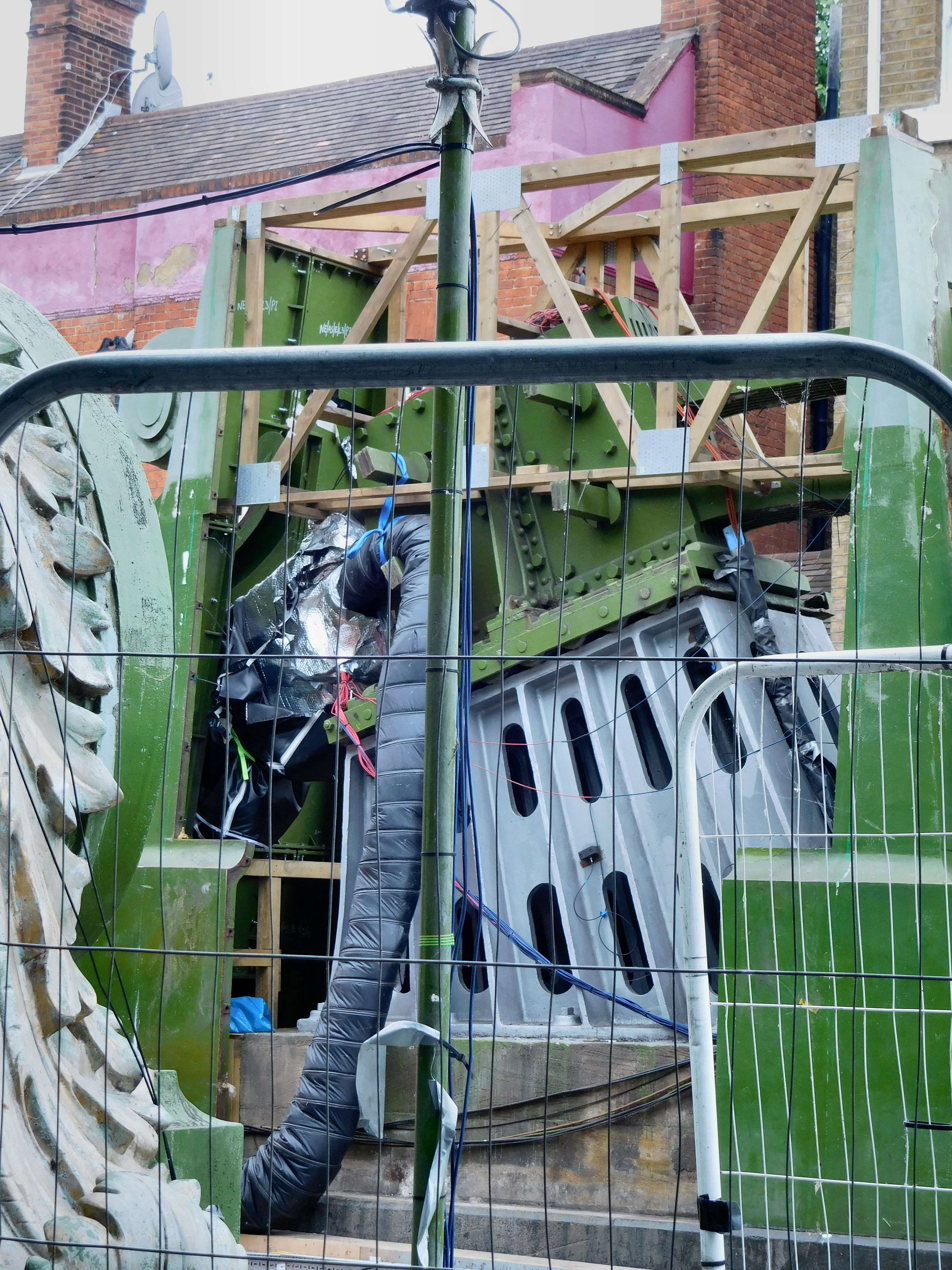
Repair works to the bridge footings, showing air-conditioning and sensors

The first Hammersmith Bridge was designed by William Tierney Clark and opened in 1827 and was the first suspension bridge crossing the River Thames. It was redesigned by Joseph Bazalgette, and reopened in 1887. In August 2020, it closed to pedestrians, cyclists and road traffic as the cast iron pedestals that hold the suspension system in place became unsafe. Work began to improve the structural integrity of the bridge in 2022.

On 1 July 2026, Hammersmith and Fulham council shelved its plans to reopen the bridge for motor traffic, because of the extensive repairs needed.

== In literature and music ==
Hammersmith features in Charles Dickens's Great Expectations as the home of the Pocket family. Pip resides with the Pockets in their house by the river and goes boating on the river. The textile designer William Morris, who became a Hammersmith resident, wrote the utopian 1890 novel News from Nowhere about a journey up the river from Hammersmith towards Oxford.

In 1930, Gustav Holst composed Hammersmith, a work for military band (later rewritten for orchestra), reflecting his impressions of the area, having lived across the river in Barnes for nearly forty years. It begins with a haunting musical depiction of the River Thames flowing underneath Hammersmith Bridge. Holst taught music at St Paul's Girls' School and composed many of his most famous works there, including his The Planets suite. A music room in the school is named after him. Holst dedicated Hammersmith: "To the Author of "The Water Gypsies". In 1933 he wrote another work that references the area, his Brook Green Suite, for the school, which is on Brook Green.

== Notable people ==
=== 17th century ===
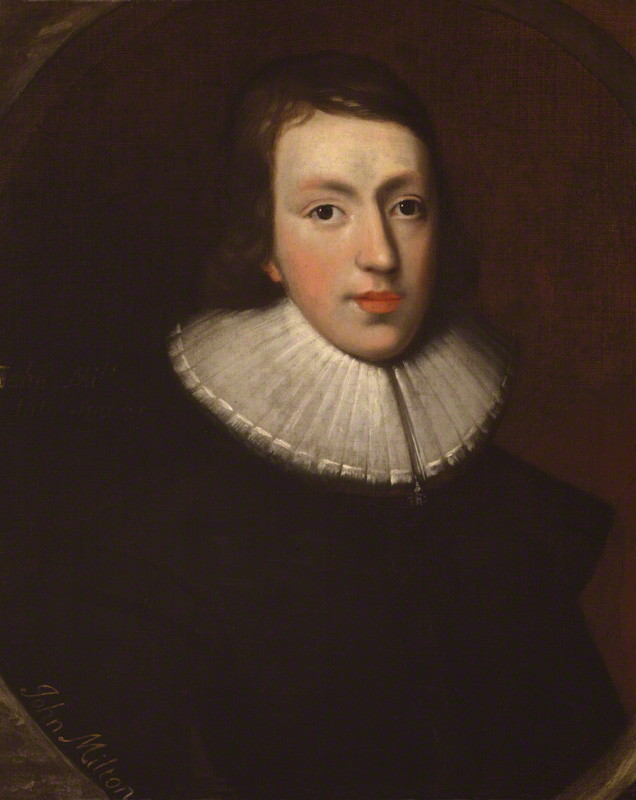
John Milton, poet

- John Milton (1608–1674), poet
- William Sheridan (c. 1635 – 3 October 1711), Bishop of Kilmore and Ardagh

=== 18th century ===
- William Belsham (1752–1827), political writer and historian
- Charles Burney (1757–1817), schoolmaster
- Caroline of Brunswick (1768–1821), princess and Queen Consort of George IV
- William Crathern (1793–1861), composer
- Lewis Kennedy (c. 1721 – 1782), nurseryman
- James Lee (1715–1795), nurseryman

=== 19th century ===
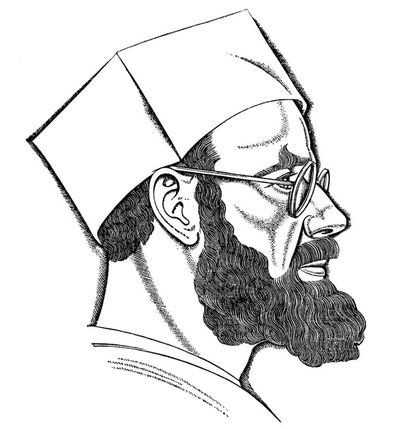
Eric Gill, typographer

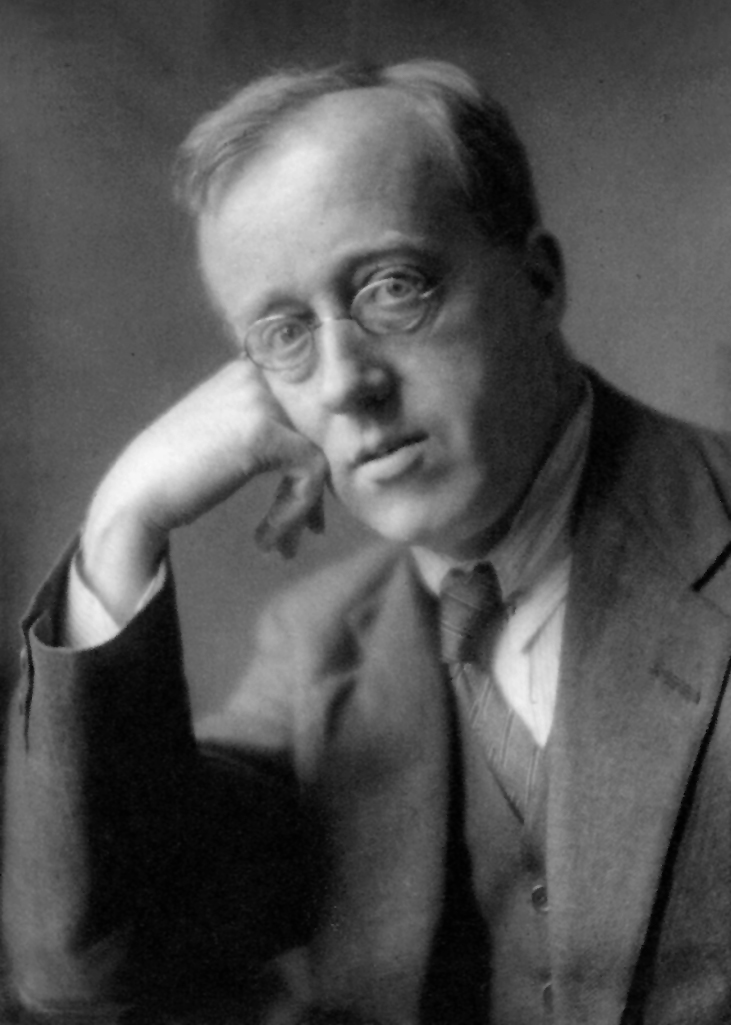
Gustav Holst, composer

- Frank Brangwyn (1867–1956), artist, painter, and designer, lived at Temple Lodge.
- T. J. Cobden Sanderson (1840–1922), artist and bookbinder
- William Tierney Clark (1783–1852), civil engineer, designer of first Hammersmith bridge
- Ellen and William Craft, (1826–1891, 1824–1900), slave abolitionists
- Jeanne Deroin (1805–1894), French socialist feminist
- Eric Gill (1882–1940), typographer and printmaker
- A. P. Herbert (1890–1971), humorist
- Gustav Holst (1874–1934), composer, taught music at St Paul's Girls' School
- Leigh Hunt (1784–1859), critic, essayist, poet, and writer
- Edward Johnston (1872–1944), scholar, credited with the revival of calligraphy
- William Morris (1834–1896), artist, writer, socialist and activist
- Ouida (Maria Louise Ramé, 1839–1908), novelist
- Francis Ronalds (1788–1873), inventor, built the first working telegraph at Hammersmith Mall
- Frederic George Stephens (1827–1907), art critic
- Emery Walker (1851–1933), engraver and printer
- Christopher Whall (1849–1924), stained glass artist
- Evelyn Whitaker (1844–1929), children's writer
- George Wimpey (1855–1913), stonemason

=== 1900–1945 ===
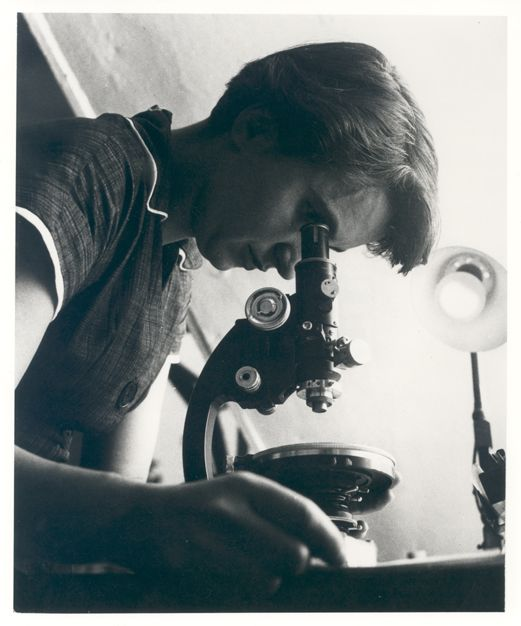
Rosalind Franklin, chemist

- Alan Bond (1938–2015), businessman
- George Devine (1910–1966), director
- Mary Fedden (1915–2012), artist
- Rosalind Franklin (1920–1958), X-ray crystallographer
- Jocelyn Herbert (1917–2003), stage designer
- Helen Mirren (born 1945), actor
- Maurice Murphy (1935–2010), trumpet player
- Eric Newby (1919–2006), travel writer
- Eric Ravilious (1903–1942), artist
- Tony Richardson (1928–1991), theatre and film director
- Diana Rigg (1938–2020), actor
- Vidal Sassoon (1928–2012), hairdresser
- Labi Siffre (born 1945), musician
- Julian Trevelyan (1910–1988), artist

=== 1946–2000 ===
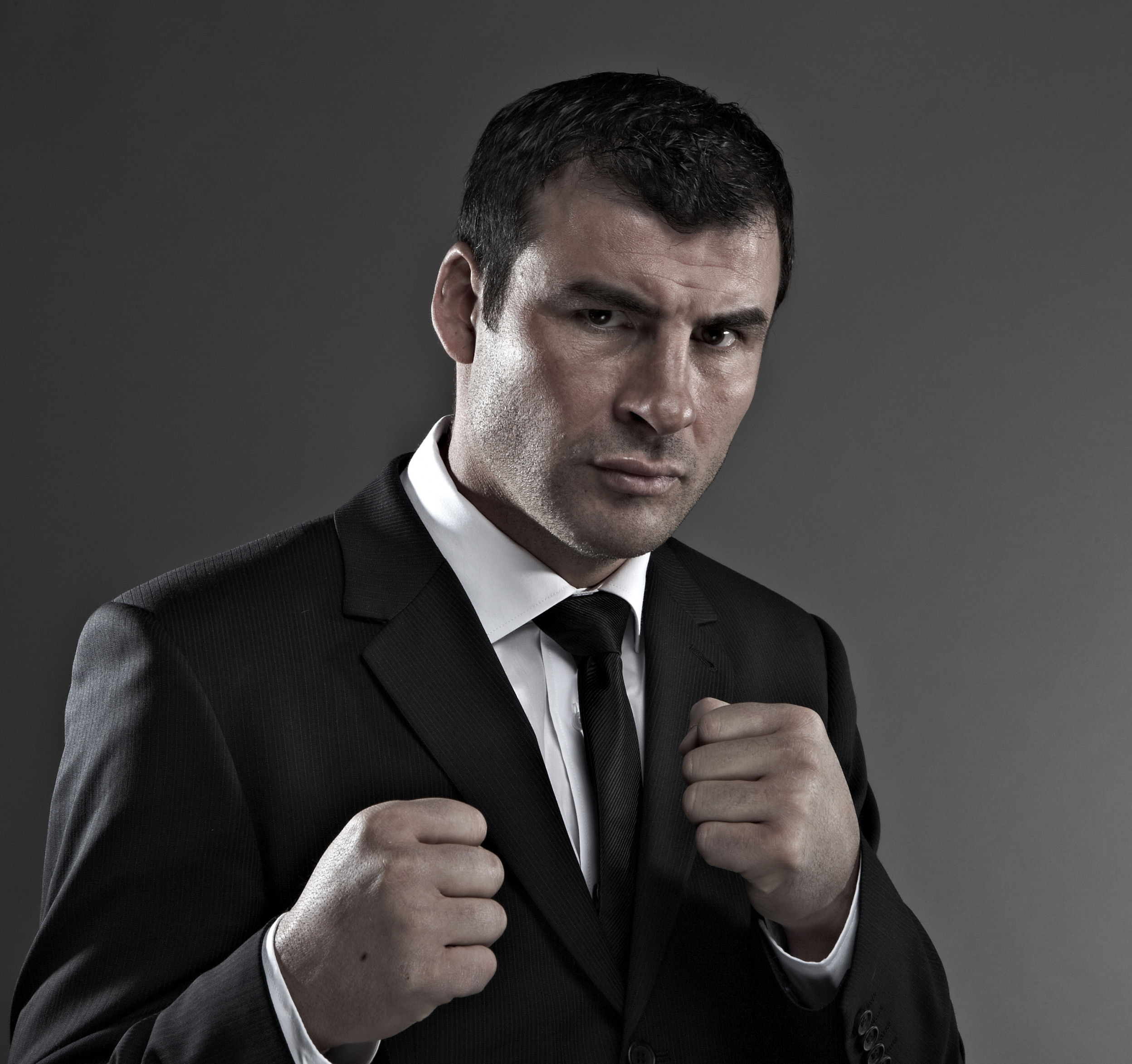
Joe Calzaghe, boxer

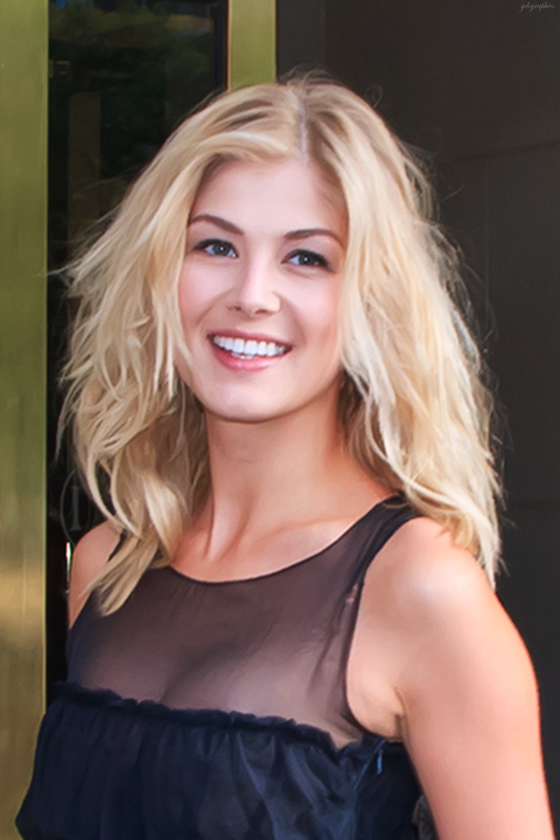
Rosamund Pike, actor

- Alfie Allen (born 1986), actor
- Lily Allen (born 1985), pop singer
- Richard Ayoade (born 1977), actor and comedian
- Bill Bailey (born 1964), comedian
- Sacha Baron Cohen (born 1971), comedian and actor
- Marcus Bent (born 1978), footballer
- Joe Calzaghe (born 1972), boxer
- Parosha Chandran (born 1969), human rights barrister
- Sebastian Coe (born 1956), athlete and politician
- Marie Colvin (1956–2012), journalist
- Benedict Cumberbatch (born 1976), actor
- James DeGale (born 1986), boxer
- Cara Delevingne (born 1992), model and actor
- Emerald Fennell (born 1985), filmmaker
- Ralph Fiennes (born 1962), actor
- Emilia Fox (born 1974), actor
- Nicholas Galitzine (born 1994), actor
- Hugh Grant (born 1960), actor
- Michael Gove (born 1967), politician
- George Groves (born 1988), boxer
- Tom Hardy (born 1977), actor
- Miranda Hart (born 1972), actor
- Gary Hibbs (born 1957), former professional footballer
- Sophie Hunter (born 1978), theatre and opera director
- James May (born 1963), television presenter
- Barbara Mayo (1946–1970), victim of unsolved murder
- Douglas Murray (born 1979), author, journalist
- Gary Numan (born 1958), musician
- Majed Osman (born 1994), footballer
- Scott Overall (born 1983), marathon runner
- Stuart Pearce (born 1962), footballer
- Rosamund Pike (born 1979), actor
- Stephen Poliakoff (born 1952), playwright
- Imogen Poots (born 1989), actor
- Jacob Rees-Mogg (born 1969), politician
- Toby Regbo (born 1991), actor
- Alan Rickman (1946–2016), actor
- Solomon Rose (born c. 1987), electronic musician
- Luke Stoughton (born 1977), cricketer
- Estelle Swaray (born 1980), musician
- Juno Temple (born 1989), actor
- Suki Waterhouse (born 1992), actor and model
- Alan Wilder (born 1959), electronic musician
- Ed Zitron (born 1986 or 1987), journalist and AI critic

== See also ==
- List of districts in Hammersmith and Fulham
