= Parks and open spaces in the London Borough of Hammersmith and Fulham =

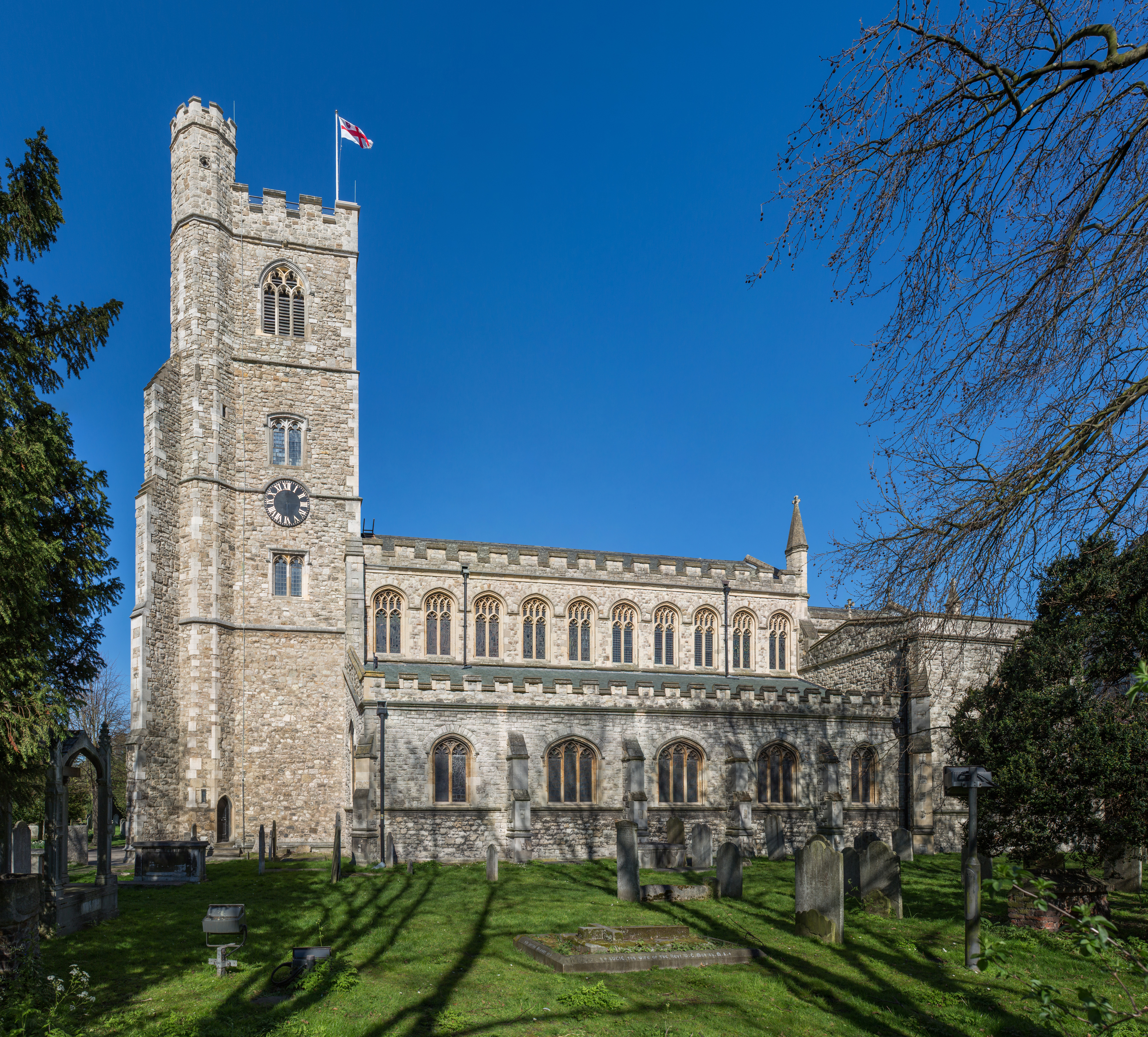
All Saints Church, Fulham, London

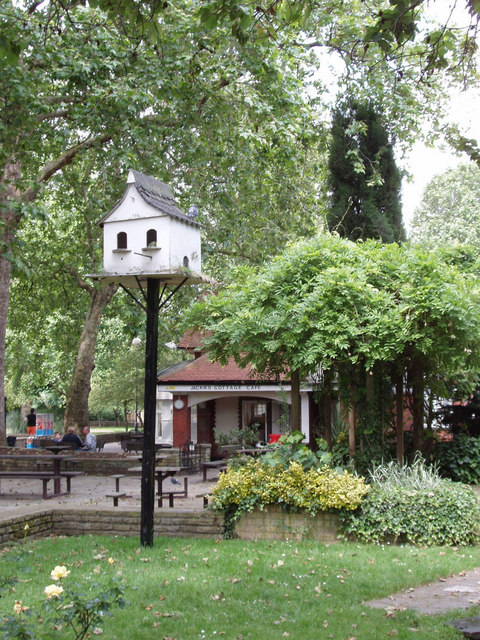
Dovecot in Bishop's Park

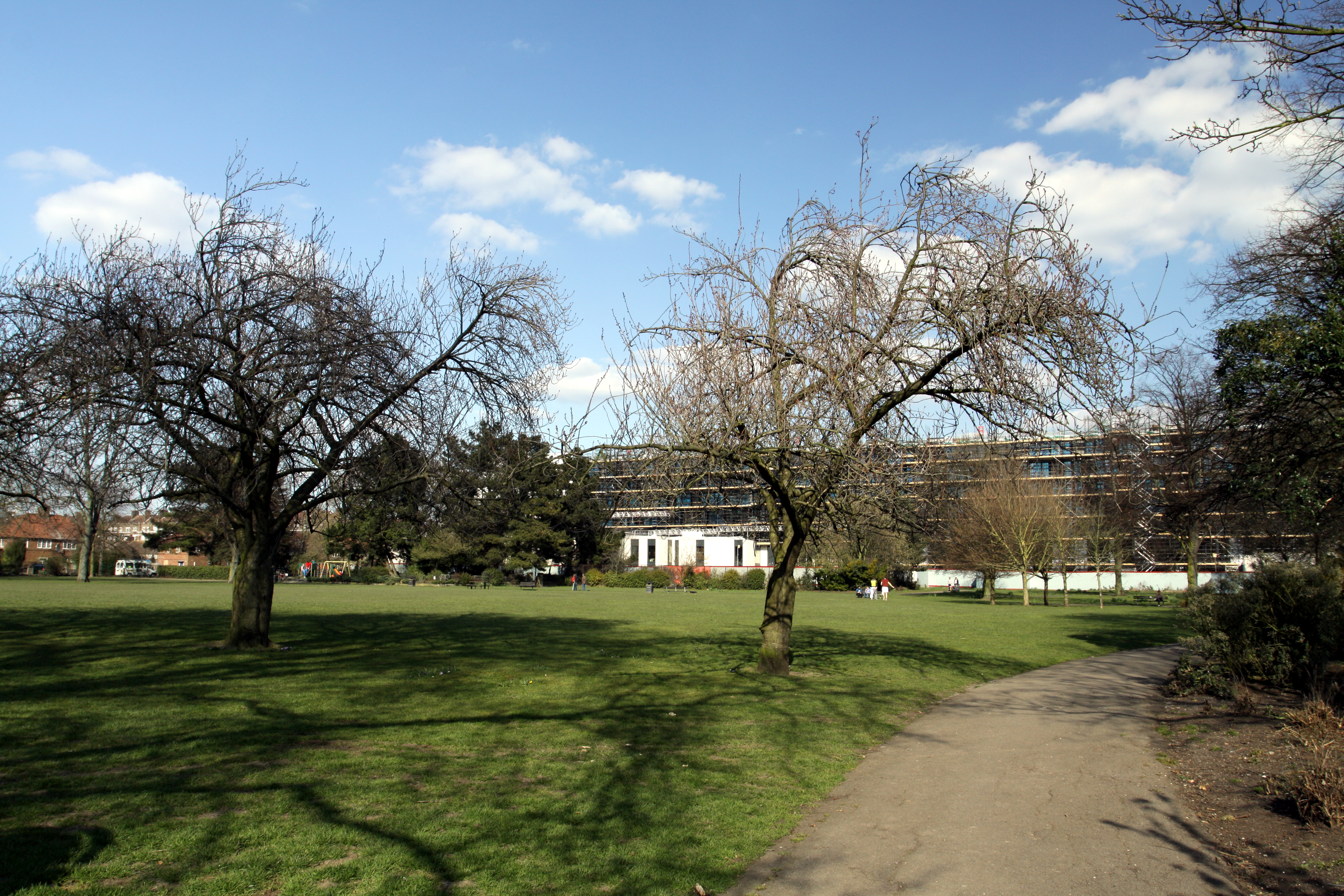
Wormholt Park in spring 2013

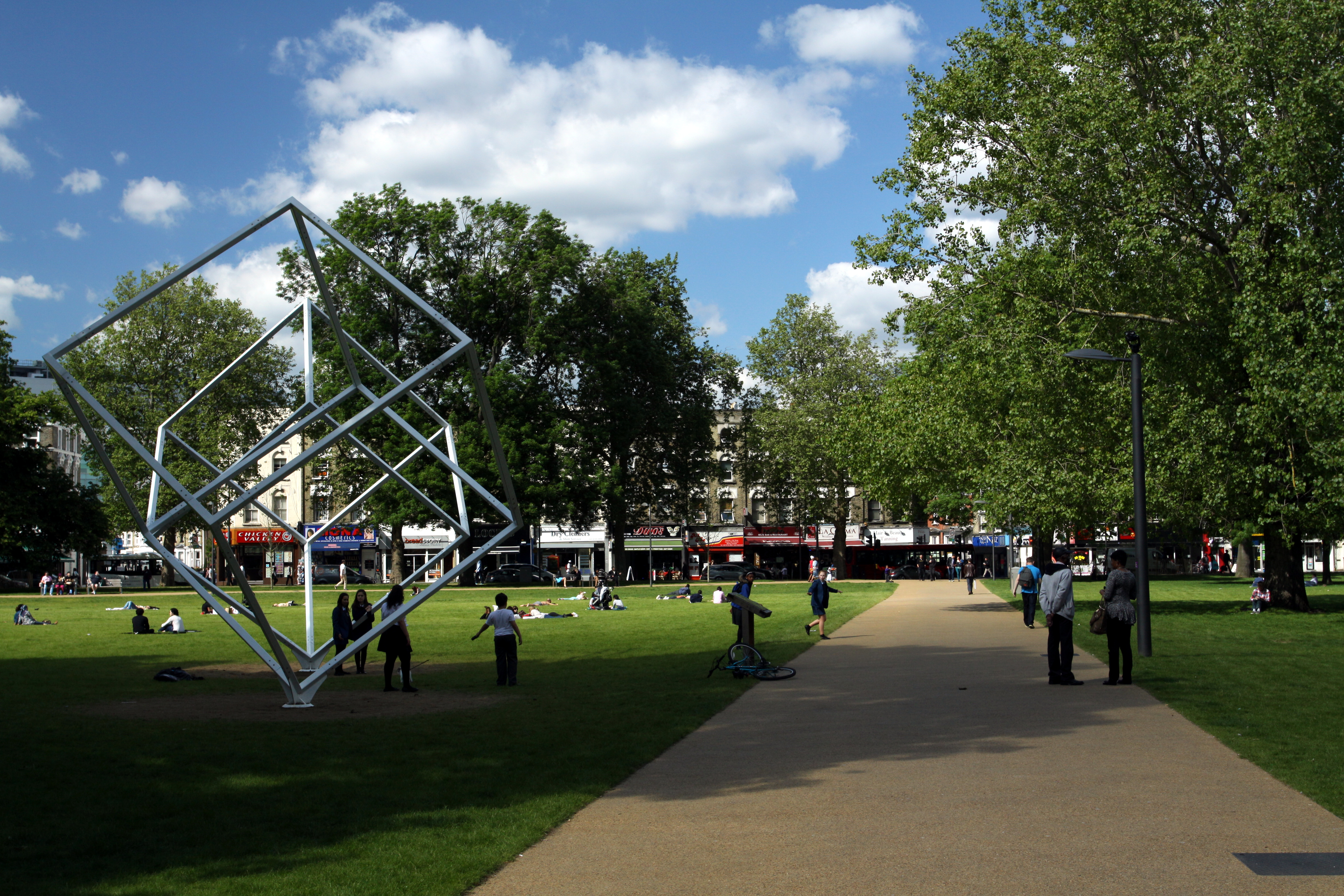
Shepherds Bush Common in spring 2013

The London Borough of Hammersmith & Fulham, an Inner London borough, has 231 hectares of parks and open spaces that are accessible to the general public, 159 hectares being within parks and 52.5 hectares within cemeteries and churchyards. Wormwood Scrubs and Scrubs Wood, located in the north of the Borough account for 42 hectares and Fulham Palace and Bishop's Park grounds contain another 14 hectares of open space. Private open space includes Hurlingham, Fulham and Queen's Club in West Kensington.

The main areas of open space in the Borough are:

- All Saints Churchyard, Fulham
- Bishops Park, Fulham
- Brompton Park in Seagrave Road, Fulham
- Brook Green
- Eel Brook Common
- Frank Banfield Park (formerly Chancellor's Park)
- Fulham Cemetery also known as Fulham Palace Road cemetery
- Furnival Gardens
- Hammersmith Park
- Hurlingham Park
- Lillie Rec
- Little Wormwood Scrubs
- Marcus Garvey Park
- Margravine Cemetery previously known as Hammersmith Cemetery
- Norland North open space, Shepherd's Bush
- Normand Park in Lillie Road
- Parsons Green
- Pineapple Park in Sands End
- Ravenscourt Park
- St Mary's RC Cemetery, College Park
- St Paul's Gardens
- St Paul's Green, Hammersmith
- St Peter's Square, Hammersmith
- St Thomas of Canterbury churchyard, Rylston Road, Fulham
- Shepherd's Bush Green (also known as Shepherd's Bush Common)
- South Park, Fulham
- Thames walkway between Craven Cottage and Hammersmith Bridge
- Wendell Park
- Wormholt Park
- Wormwood Scrubs, the borough's only Local Nature Reserve

and two Thames riverside developments, under creation at:

- Imperial Wharf, Fulham
- Hammersmith Embankment
