= Wormholt Park =

Park in the London Borough of Hammersmith & Fulham

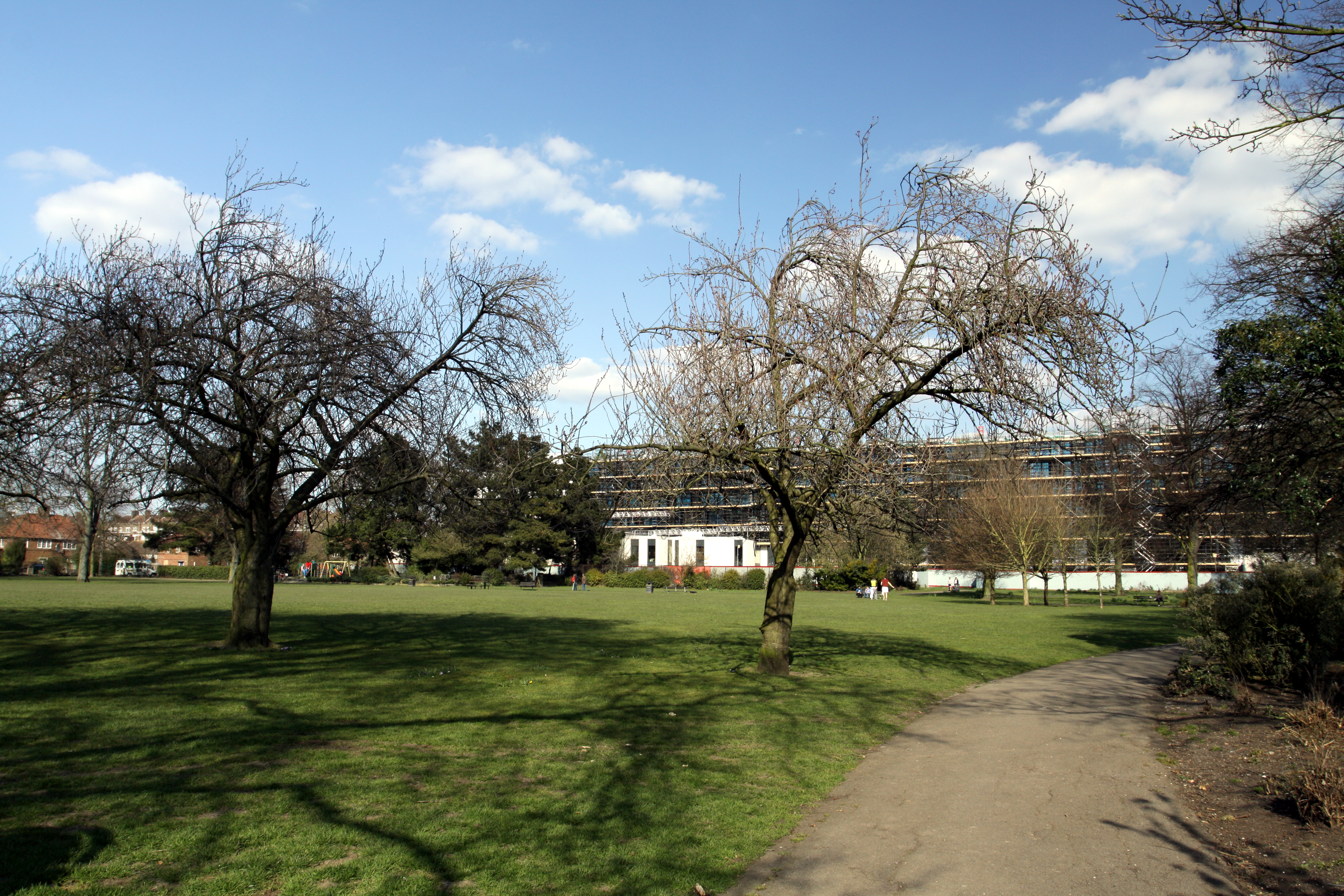
- Wormholt Park

- Location within London Borough of Hammersmith and Fulham
- Location: Hammersmith and Fulham, London, England
- Coordinates: 51°30′37″N 0°14′15″W

Wormholt Park is a 7.75 acres (3.14 ha) urban park in the London Borough of Hammersmith and Fulham, near White City, Shepherd's Bush.

Wormholt Park has a multi-use games area and two play areas, one for under 8s and one for over 8s.

== History ==
=== Origins ===
The first reference to "Wormeholt" appeared in 1189, when the Bishop of London granted tithes of the newly cleared land to the St Paul's Cathedral School. The name was a combination of the Old English "Worme" or "Wyrm" and "Holt", meaning "snake-infested wood".

The land became part of the Manor of Fulham, owned by the Bishop of London, and then descended to become the Manor of Wormholt Barns. For 200 years from 1548, Wormholt was leased to the Duke of Somerset. A family named Atley ran the land by the beginning of the 17th century, but the poor quality of the land led to frequent changes of tenancy.

By the 19th century, the Manor was split into two parts, Wormholt Farm and Eynham Farm. By 1828, these parts became Wormholt Farm and Old Oak Farm. A survey of 1833 described the soil of Wormholt Farm as "strong loam, making good grazing fields near Uxbridge Road, but towards Wormholt Wood Scrubs it becomes too stiff and too wet in winter." The north of the farm remained arable and was used for grazing, whereas the south of the farm was used for bricklaying, valued at £4,000 per acre.

By 1845 Old Oak Farm consisted of over 368 acres divided into 32 fields.

In October 1903, the Ecclesiastical Commissioners decided to sell parts of the Wormholt Farm and Old Oak Farm for development. As part of the development deal, the commissioners offered to donate the land between Bryony Road and Sawley Road road, also known as Barn Field, to the Hammersmith Metropolitan Borough Council, which was conveyed on 9 December 1909. Potential names considered by the council included Oakland’s Park, Old Oak Park or Wormholt Park.

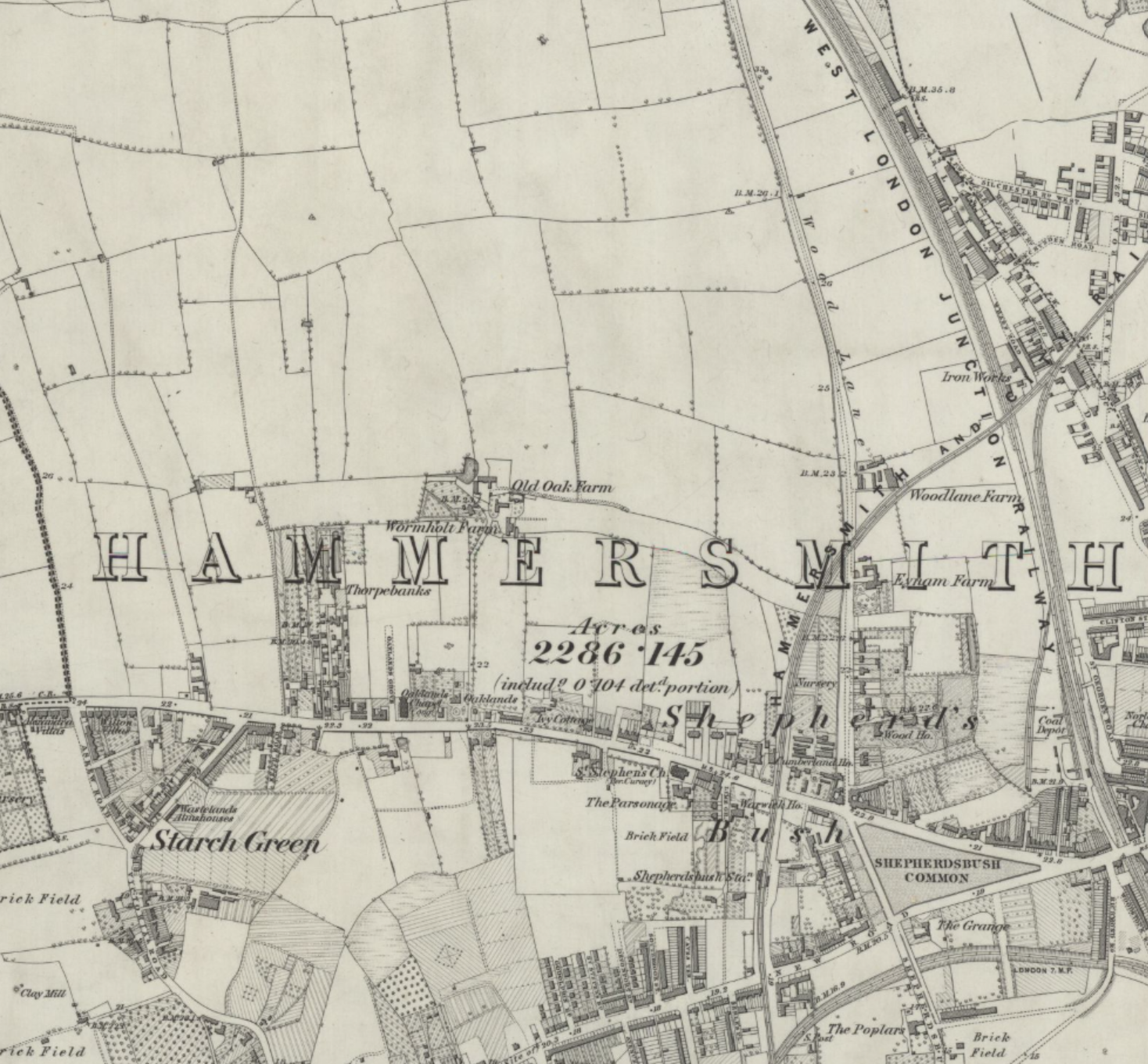
Ordnance Survey of Wormholt Park in 1874

The Coronation of King George V and Queen Mary on 22 June 1911 meant that the council hoped that a member of the royal family would open the park, however, the park was opened on 27 June 1911 at 1:30pm by Councillor Norman William Shairp, Mayor of the Metropolitan Borough of Hammersmith.

In his speech opening the park, the mayor said:

“I am pleased indeed to come here today to open the park for you as I consider it to be a great acquisition to your Borough”. Adding “The park was not so large as they would like to see and the trees were not quite so leafy as they would like to see, but they had the grass green, and if they had patience to wait the trees would give a quantity of leaf” and in conclusion he said: “I have, therefore, the pleasurable duty and honour of declaring this Wormholt Park open and to be dedicated for ever to the use of the inhabitants of the Borough of Hammersmith.”

=== Pre-war ===
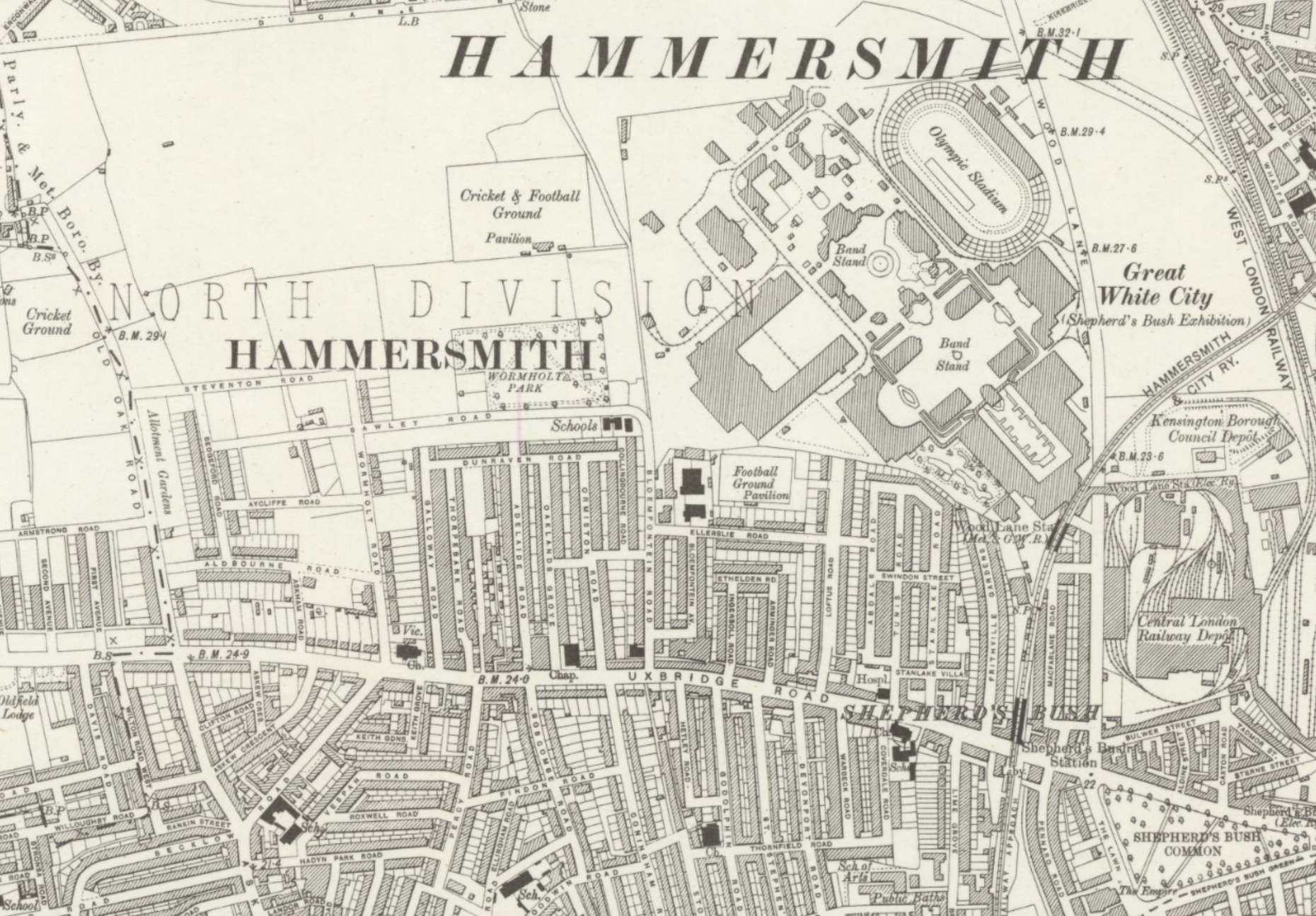
1912 Ordnance Survey of Wormholt Park

In June 1923, the Bloemfontein Open Air Swimming Bath opened next to the park.

A bandstand was built in 1931 and records for 1934 show attendance ranged from between 400 to 650 people for each performance.

In 1936, a bowling green and pavilion were built, becoming the home of Shepherds Bush Bowling Club, previously based out of Ravenscourt Park.

=== World War II ===
During World War II, the park was dug up and turned into shelter trenches and allotments, which remained until 1950.

=== Post-war ===
In the early 1950s, shelter trenches were filled in, two war-damaged tennis courts were reconstructed and the playground was resurfaced.

In 1988, the bowling green was closed down and was replaced by a new children's play area.

In 1979, the Bloemfontein Open Air Swimming Bath was converted to an indoor centre named White City Pools. The pools were renamed Janet Adegoke Leisure Centre in 1990.

In the 1980s, the park was used as a location for some episode of BBC children's series Grange Hill.

In 2003, the Janet Adegoke Leisure Centre was demolished and later converted into flats.

Following concern about the park's state of disrepair, the Friends of Wormholt Park community group was formed in 2009.

In 2015-2016, Hammersmith & Fulham Council funded a landscape refurbishment, which included excavation and removal of the remains of the Janet Adegoke Leisure Centre, the over-grown former bowling green and the former tennis court.

In 2024, the W12 festival was held in the park.
