= Hammersmith Council =

Hammersmith Council could refer to:

- Hammersmith Vestry, 1834 to 1900
- Hammersmith Metropolitan Borough Council, 1900 to 1965
- Hammersmith London Borough Council, 1965 to 1979
