= Coat of arms of the London Borough of Hammersmith and Fulham =

London borough council coat of arms

- Adopted: 1 March 1965
- Crest: On a wreath Argent and Sanguine out of a mural crown of six turrets Or an ancient ship oars in action Sable sail set flags and pennon flying Sanguine the sail charged with two hammers in saltire interlaced with a horseshoe Or
- Shield: Barry wavy Argent and Azure two hammers in saltire interlaced with a horseshoe Or on a chief Gules two swords in saltire Proper hilts and pommels Or a mitre of the last
- Supporter: On each side a male griffin Gules beaked and irradiated Or armed and langued Azure each gorged with a cord Or pendent from that of the dexter an escallop and from that of the sinister a cross crosslet Argent
- Motto: Spectemur Agendo (Let Us Be Judged By Our Actions)

The coat of arms of the London Borough of Hammersmith and Fulham was granted to the then London Borough of Hammersmith on 1 March 1965, but the motto changed languages in 1969. The subsequent change of names to Hammersmith and Fulham on 1 January 1980 did not affect the arms.

== Design ==
The wavy lines in the main field of the shield are taken from the coat of arms of the former Metropolitan Borough of Fulham and are a symbol for the River Thames and its water. The hammers and horseshoe are a pun on the name of Hammersmith and come from the coat of arms of the former Metropolitan Borough of Hammersmith. There were also horseshoes in the arms of Sir Nicholas Crispe, Bt, whose works in Hammersmith in the 17th century contributed significantly to the growth of the town. The red chief has charges from the coat of arms of the former Fulham arms. The crossed swords are taken from the coat of arms of the Diocese of London and the mitre stands for the Bishop of London since the Parishes of Fulham and Hammersmith used to constitute a manor belonging to the bishop.

The wreath under the crest is in silver and sanguine and the sail, flags, and pennons on the Viking ship in the crest are also in sanguine. Sanguine, a deep, dark red colour, is not a common colour in heraldry and is rightly not even a colour but a "stain". Why there is sanguine in these arms is not officially explained, but perhaps because of the old arms of Hammersmith which, though blazoned red (gules), used to be depicted in a deep pink colour, or perhaps signifying the bloodthirst of the Vikings. The mantling has the blue and silver tinctures of Fulham. The crest consists of a mural crown, a common heraldic symbol for a town or a city, and the aforementioned ship, which was brought from the former arms of Fulham and signifies the 879 AD landing of Danish Vikings at what now is Fulham.

The supporters are male griffins, their gender being distinguished by their lack of wings. The griffins are irradiated, which means they have bursts of golden rays coming out from their bodies. They may symbolize dynamism or vigilance. The griffins have an escallop shell and a cross crosslet respectively hanging around their necks. The cross is from the coat of arms of Edward Latymer, who died in 1626 and left lands for the benefit of the poor in Hammersmith and for the education of poor boys. The escallop is for George Pring, a surgeon in Hammersmith who projected the first Hammersmith Bridge over the Thames, but he died three years before the project was completed in 1827. This suspension bridge contributed greatly to the town's development, opening new markets on both sides of the river; it was replaced by a new suspension bridge at the same site in 1887, the current-day Hammersmith Bridge. In the coat of arms of the former Metropolitan Borough of Hammersmith, the cross crosslet and the escallop shell were used as charges on the shield.

== Motto ==
The original motto of 1965 was 'judge by our labour', but in 1969 the borough changed this to the present "spectemur agendo", Latin for the same phrase, even if the borough officially translates it as 'let us be judged by our actions'. The Metropolitan Borough of Hammersmith had used the same motto in Latin too.

== Coat of arms of the Metropolitan Boroughs of Fulham and Hammersmith ==
Coat of arms of the Metropolitan Borough of Hammersmith

Coat of arms of the Metropolitan Borough of Fulham

== See also ==
- Armorial of London
