= Hammersmith power station =

Former coal-fired power station in England

- Country: England
- Location: Hammersmith, London
- Coordinates: 51°29′24″N 00°13′18″W
- Status: Decommissioned and demolished
- Commission date: 1897
- Decommission date: 1965
- Owners: Hammersmith Vestry (1897–1900); Hammersmith Borough Council (1900–1948); British Electricity Authority (1948–1955); Central Electricity Authority (1955–1957); Central Electricity Generating Board (1958–1965)
- Operator: As owner

Thermal power station
- Primary fuel: Coal
- Turbine technology: Steam turbines
- Cooling source: Tidal river water

Power generation
- Units operational: 2 x 10 MW
- Make and model: 10 MW Parsons
- Nameplate capacity: 20 MW
- Annual net output: 19.09 GWh (1946)

Hammersmith power station supplied electricity to the London Borough of Hammersmith from 1897 to 1965. It was owned and operated by the Hammersmith Vestry and then the Hammersmith Metropolitan Borough Council until the nationalisation of the British electricity supply industry in 1948. The power station was frequently redeveloped with new plant over its operational life to meet increased demands for electricity. It was decommissioned in 1965.

== History ==
In 1893 the Hammersmith Vestry applied for a provisional order under the Electric Lighting Acts to generate and supply electricity to the parish. The Hammersmith Electric Lighting Order 1893 was granted by the Board of Trade and was confirmed by Parliament through the Electric Lighting Orders Confirmation (No. 3) Act 1893 (56 & 57 Vict. c. xl). The power station was built off Fulham Palace Road, north of Yeldham Road (51°29′24″N 0°13′18″W) and first supplied electricity on 21 June 1897 to a potential population of 104,000 (1898).

== Equipment specification ==
The original 1898 plant at Hammersmith power station comprised two Babcock and Wilcox boilers of the water-tube type and one Lancashire Tetlow boiler. These fed a common steam ring feeding steam to three J&H McLaren engines driving 125 kW 2,200 Volt Ferranti flywheel disc alternators. In addition there was a 25 kW Bellis engine driving a 25 kW Ferranti alternator used for daytime as load initially was primarily lighting. Power was distributed to seven substations.In 1899 a further Babcock & Wilcox boiler was added along with 2 Robey vertical cross compound engines each feeding a ECC 300 kW alternator.

The power station was then enlarged to allow an three additional boilers to power two Robey engines with Siemens iron core alternators of 600 kilowatts output.

Hammersmith power station, generating capacity and load
Year	Generating capacity, kW	Maximum connected load, kW
1898	400	317
1899	1,275	550
1904	2,500	1,596
1913	10,300	5,788
1919	10,300	8,389

=== Inter-war plant ===
Following the First World War further new plant was installed to meet growing demand for electricity.

In 1920 a 10,000 kW Parsons turbo alternator set running at 3000 rpm was installed and by 1923 the generating plant comprised:

- Coal-fired boilers generating up to 190,000 lb/h (23.9 kg/s) of steam, these supplied steam to:
- Generators
  - 1 × 1,500 kW steam turbo-alternator
  - 2 × 2,000 kW steam turbo-alternators
  - 1 × 3,000 kW steam turbo-alternator
  - 1 × 10,000 kW steam turbo-alternator

These machines gave a total generating capacity of 18,500 kW of alternating current.

The plant installed in 1919 included the UK's first large pulverised fuel fired boilers, these were provided on three of the units used a bin feed system. Hydraulic coal delivery was also introduced at Hammersmith.

A choice of electricity supplies were available to consumers:

- 2-phase, 50 Hz AC at 110 and 220 Volts
- 3-phase, 50 Hz AC at 110 and 220 Volts.

=== New plant 1937 ===
In 1937 the generating capacity of the station was 28,500 kW, the maximum load was 23,850 kW, and the connections on the system were 69.822 MW.

By 1954 the plant comprised:

- Boilers:
  - 1 × 17,000 lb/h (2.1 kg/s) Stirling boilers with chain grate stoker,
  - 2 × 20,000 lb/h (2.5 kg/s) Stirling boilers with chain grate stokers,
  - 1 × 37,000 lb/h (4.7 kg/s) Stirling boilers with chain grate stoker,
  - 3 × 45,000 lb/h (5.7 kg/s) Stirling boilers with chain grate stokers,

The total evaporative capacity was 229,000 lb/h (28.8 kg/s), steam conditions were 200 psi and 620–650 °F (13.8 bar, 327–343 °C), and supplied steam to:

- Turbo-alternators:
  - 2 × Parsons 10 MW turbo-alternators, 3000 rpm, generating at 6.6 kV

Condenser cooling water was taken from the River Thames.

== Operations ==
Operational data for the early years of operation was as follows:

Hammersmith operational data 1898–1920
Year	Number of consumers	Public Lamps connected	Electricity sold, MWh
1898	132	87	234.8
1899	275		372.2
1904	1,469	252	2,223.9
1912	3,329	866	9,167.9
1919	4,603	880	15,962.8
1920	5,068	942	13,779.9

There was a growth in the number of consumers and the amount of current sold within yearly variations.

=== Operating data 1921–23 ===
The operating data for the period 1921–23 is shown in the table:

Hammersmith power station operating data 1921–23
Electricity Use	Units	Year		
Electricity Use	Units	1921	1922	1923
Lighting and domestic use	MWh	2,723	2,732	3,332
Public lighting use	MWh	924	886	1,062
Traction	MWh	–	–	–
Power use	MWh	11,534	10,999	11,336
Total use	MWh	15,498	15,262	16,255
Load and connected load
Maximum load	kW	8,400	8,295	8,600
Total connections	kW	16,243	18,629	19,500
Load factor	Per cent	24.9	25.5	26.7
Financial
Revenue from sales of current	£	–	175,794	148,353
Surplus of revenue over expenses	£	–	52,656	72,603

Under the terms of the Electricity (Supply) Act 1926 (16 & 17 Geo. 5. c. 51) the Central Electricity Board (CEB) was established in 1926. The CEB identified high efficiency ‘selected’ power stations that would supply electricity most effectively. The CEB also constructed the National Grid (1927–33) to connect power stations within a region. Hammersmith power station was electrically connected to Fulham power station via twin 66 kV underground cables and to Barnes power station via triple 6.6 kV underground lines.

=== Operating data 1937 and 1946 ===
Hammersmith power station operating data, 1937 and 1946 is as follows.

Hammersmith power station operating data, 1937 and 1946
Year	Load factor per cent	Max output load, MW	Electricity supplied GWh	Thermal efficiency, per cent	Customers
1937	39.1	23,850	74.803 (none generated)	–	35,079
1946	13.6	16,032	19.095	12.6	–

The British electricity supply industry was nationalised in 1948 under the provisions of the Electricity Act 1947 (10 & 11 Geo. 6. c. 54). The Hammersmith electricity undertaking was abolished, ownership of Hammersmith power station was vested in the British Electricity Authority, and subsequently the Central Electricity Authority and the Central Electricity Generating Board (CEGB). At the same time the electricity distribution and sales responsibilities of the Hammersmith electricity undertaking were transferred to the London Electricity Board (LEB).

=== Operating data 1954–65 ===
Operating data for the period 1954–65 is shown in the table:

Hammersmith power station operating data, 1954–65
Year	Running hours or load factor (per cent)	Max output capacity MW	Electricity supplied GWh	Thermal efficiency per cent
1954	593	17	3.436	7.73
1955	718	17	3.937	7.63
1956	502	17	3.518	7.60
1957	178	17	0.741	3.49
1958	267	17	1.136	4.77
1961	1.1 %	15	1.492	5.68
1962	1.6 %	15	2.147	6.63
1963	3.77 %	15	4.953	9.30
1964	2.85 %	15	3.461	8.82
1965	4.2 %	15	5.462	8.72

The data demonstrates the less intensive use of the power station during its last decade of operating life.

Electricity supplied, in MWh, by Hammersmith power station over its operating life

== Closure ==
Hammersmith power station was decommissioned in 1965. The buildings subsequently demolished and the area has been redeveloped with commercial and residential buildings.

== See also ==
- Timeline of the UK electricity supply industry
- List of power stations in England
