= Bloemfontein Lido =

Swimming pool in the London Borough of Hammersmith & Fulham

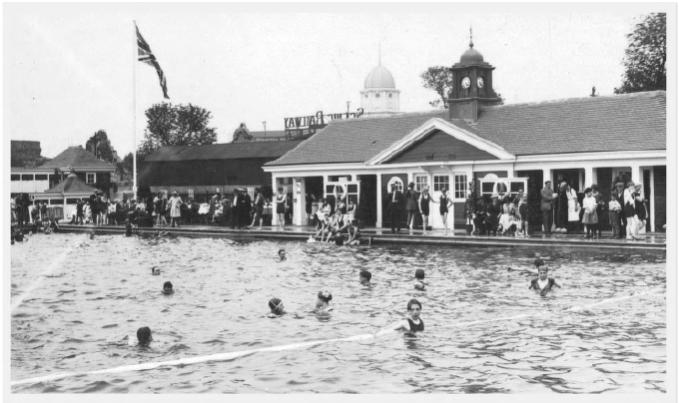
- Postcard featuring Bloemfontein Open Air Swimming Bath, White City 1955
- Interactive map of Bloemfontein Lido
- Location: Wormholt Park; Bloemfontein Road, W12 0LQ
- Coordinates: 51.510739°N 0.235453°W
- Operator: Hammersmith and Fulham London Borough Council
- Dimensions: Length: 150 feet (46 m); Width: 75 feet (23 m); Depth: 7 feet (2.1 m)

Construction
- Opened: 1923
- Closed: 1979
- Demolished: 2003

Bloemfontein Lido (also known as the Open-Air Swimming Bath on Bloemfontein Road, Hammersmith Open Air Swimming Pool) was a lido in the London Borough of Hammersmith and Fulham, located next to Wormholt Park.

The lido first opened in 1923, In 1979, the lido was converted to an indoor centre, White City Pools. The site was renamed to the Janet Adegoke Leisure Centre in 1990. The centre was demolished in 2003 and later converted into flats.

== History ==
Wormholt Park opened on 27 June 1911. The desirability of providing an open-air swimming bath in the Borough was first considered by the Baths and Wash-houses Committee in April 1919 and October 1921. Work on the site began in February 1921.

The Open-Air Swimming Bath on Bloemfontein Road, W12, was formally opened on Saturday 4 August 1923 by Alderman Marshall Hays, Mayor of Hammersmith. Bloemfontein Lido's main entrance was centrally placed with dressing boxes placed to either side – females to the left and males to the right. The pool had its deep end in the centre, measuring 7.25 feet (2.21 m). It was 150 feet (46 m) long and 75 feet (23 m) wide. The floor of the pool was granolithic paving and all footways were paved in artificial stone. Facilities included refreshment areas, tea rooms, store rooms for clubs and a cycle park.

The 150 feet (46 m) open air pool featured water polo matches, international swimming events and diving exhibitions from the 13 feet (4.0 m) high staging. The pool hosted swimming and diving championships and an International Water Polo Match, notably the Penguin Water Polo Players (based at Lime Grove Baths) v. the USA Water Polo Team.

In 1979, the lido was converted into a "Tropical Lagoon", named White City Pools. The site was renamed to the Janet Adegoke Leisure Centre in 1990, after the first black Mayor of London Hammersmith.

In 2003, the centre was demolished and later converted into flats. In 2006, a new leisure complex further up Bloemfontein Road, the Phoenix Fitness Centre and Janet Adegoke Swimming Pool, was named after Adegoke.

In 2016, Hammersmith & Fulham Council funded a landscape refurbishment of Wormholt Park, which, amongst other works, included the removal of the remains of the Centre.
