= Cathnor Park =

Park in London

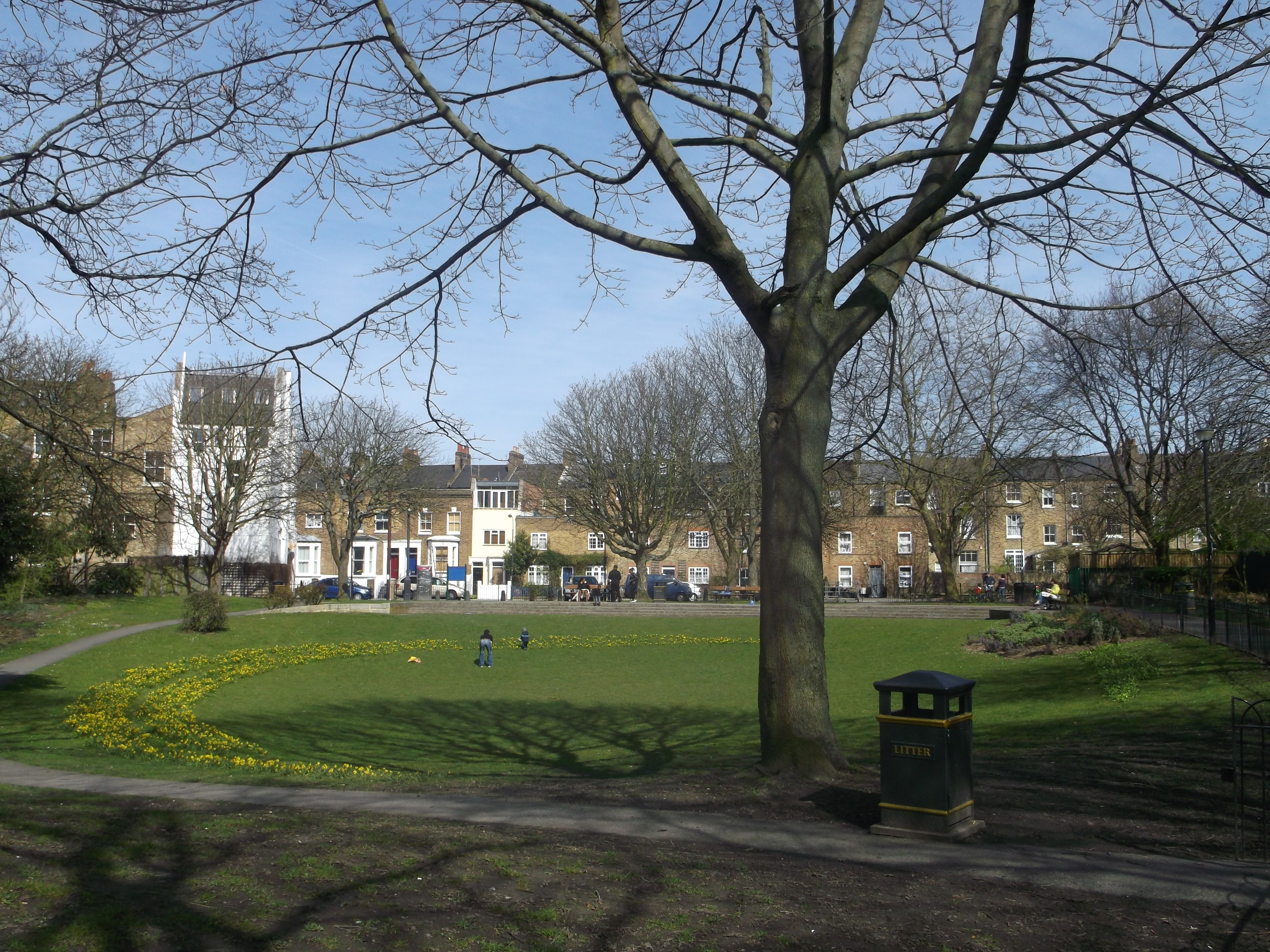
- Cathnor Park
- Interactive map of Cathnor Park
- Location: Hammersmith and Fulham, London, England
- Coordinates: 51°30′09″N 0°14′12″W

Cathnor Park is a public park in the London Borough of Hammersmith and Fulham, located to the west of Shepherd's Bush Green and north of the Goldhawk Road, and was first opened in 1973.

== History ==
Cathnor Park was opened in 1973, and was first laid out on a former bomb site that had been largely derelict. The decision was taken in 1971 by the Hammersmith & Fulham Development Group Committee to provide more open space in the area west of Shepherd's Bush and north of the Goldhawk Road, and this was achieved when the land was transferred to the London Borough of Hammersmith and Fulham.

== Today ==
Cathnor Park is framed by Greenside Road to the west, Goodwin Road to the North, and Melina Road to the east. To the south is Hammersmith Academy. In March 2019 a Friends of Cathnor Park was established to help maintain the park and combat crime and anti-social behaviour.

== See also ==
- Hammersmith Park
