= Spectemur agendo =

Latin phrase and motto

Spectemur Agendo is a Latin motto meaning Let us be judged by our acts.

== Sources ==
It comes originally from Book XIII of Ovid's Metamorphoses where it is attributed to the hero Ajax:

Denique (quid verbis opus est?) spectemur agendo!

which is literally translated as

Finally (what is the use of words?) let us be judged by the doing [sc. deeds]!

== Zambian Institutions ==
In Zambia, it is the motto of a National Technical Secondary School Hillcrest National Technical Secondary School. (Let Us By Our Deeds Be Judged)

== Canadian institutions ==
It was the ship's motto of HMCS Qu'Appelle (DDE 264), with the translation Let us be judged by our actions.

== United Kingdom institutions ==
In the United Kingdom, it was first adopted as the motto of The Royal Dragoons (1st Dragoons) regiment of the British Army. It is the current Motto for A Company of the Royal Irish Regiment

It is the civic motto of:

- London Borough of Lambeth, with the translation Let us be regarded according to our conduct;
- Hammersmith and Fulham London Borough Council, using the translation Let us be judged by our actions,
  - it was also used by the previous Hammersmith Metropolitan Borough Council and the earlier Hammersmith Vestry;
- the Metropolitan Borough of Barnsley covering the town of Barnsley and a surrounding area in South Yorkshire. The Borough uses the more direct translation Judge us by our Actions in publicity; the motto appears with the town crest on the shirts of Barnsley F.C. football club.

Spectemur agendo is also the motto of:

- The RSEA (Rangers supporters erskine appeal)
- The National Examining Board for Dental Nurses (NEBDN)
- The Royal Dublin Fusiliers
- The Royal Munster Fusiliers
- RAF Benson
- The 148 (Barnsley) Squadron of the Air Training Corps Based in Barnsley
- The 344 (Fulham) Squadron of the Air Training Corps based in Hammersmith.
- Kingsbury High School
- the Albion FC Clapham, London.
- Maclear House, at King's College School, Wimbledon.
- Swindon Cricket Club
- Freemason Lodge in Germany (Düsseldorf)
- The Lancashire Regiment (Prince of Wales Volunteers)
- The Barnsley & District Table Tennis Association
- Old Saltleians RFC, Birmingham

and was once the motto of Dishforth Police Training Centre. The motto was then adopted by the North Eastern Police Training Centre at Durham, which opened when Disforth closed.

Spectemur Agendo was also the motto of the following institutions:

- Newbridge Comprehensive School, South Wales.
- Earsham Hall School, Bungay, Suffolk.
- Queens Park Rangers football club.
- Sunbury Grammar School, Sunbury-on-Thames, Middlesex.

== United States institutions ==
In the United States, it is the motto of several college student organizations including:

- the Cap and Skull Senior Honor Society (Rutgers University),
- the Beta Charge of Theta Delta Chi fraternity at Cornell University,

It is the Motto found on the challenge coin of Medic One paramedics.

It is the official motto of:

- The City of Troy (NY) Police Department Emergency Response Team (SWAT)
- Westminster Choir College (Princeton, NJ)
- Apple Valley Police Department of Minnesota.
- York City Department of Fire/Rescue (York, Pennsylvania).
- The Anaheim Kingsmen Drum and Bugle Corps - the 1972 DCI world champions.
- The Spring Hill High School soccer team in Spring Hill, Kansas, est 2007.

Sweet Briar College uses it as the class motto every four years. Their translation is We are proven by our actions

== Australian institutions ==
- Camberwell Grammar School, a Church of England school for boys in Melbourne, also wears the motto, preferring the translation By our deeds may we be known.
- Clyde House (formerly Clyde School) within Geelong Grammar School,
- Gosford High School, Gosford, New South Wales
- Hawthorn Football Club
- Rivers College, Lismore High Campus, Lismore, New South Wales
- Newcastle Grammar School
- South Sydney High School, Maroubra, New South Wales
- The Forest High School, Frenchs Forest, New South Wales

== New Zealand Schools ==
- Highlands Intermediate School, Welbourn, New Plymouth

== South African institutions ==
- South African College Schools, Cape Town, oldest school in South Africa.

== Dutch schools ==
- Gymnasium Haganum (schoolpaper: spectemur agendo-spec)

== Germany ==
- A German freemason lodge in Düsseldorf.

== Italy ==
- The high school Polo Tecnico Scientifico Brutium in Cosenza - newly created in a.y. 2020-21 merging several high schools, including former "Pezzullo" Scientific Lyceum - applies this motto in the logo appearing in their official letterhead.

== Family motto ==
'Spectemur agendo' is and has been used as a motto by armigerous families including the Earls of Shannon and Viscounts Clifden, and individuals including Edward Hussey-Montagu, 1st Earl Beaulieu, Thomas McClure, and Admiral Edward Thornbrough. It is also used by the German "von Hammerstein" family.
