= Marcus Garvey Park (London) =

Park in the London Borough of Hammersmith & Fulham

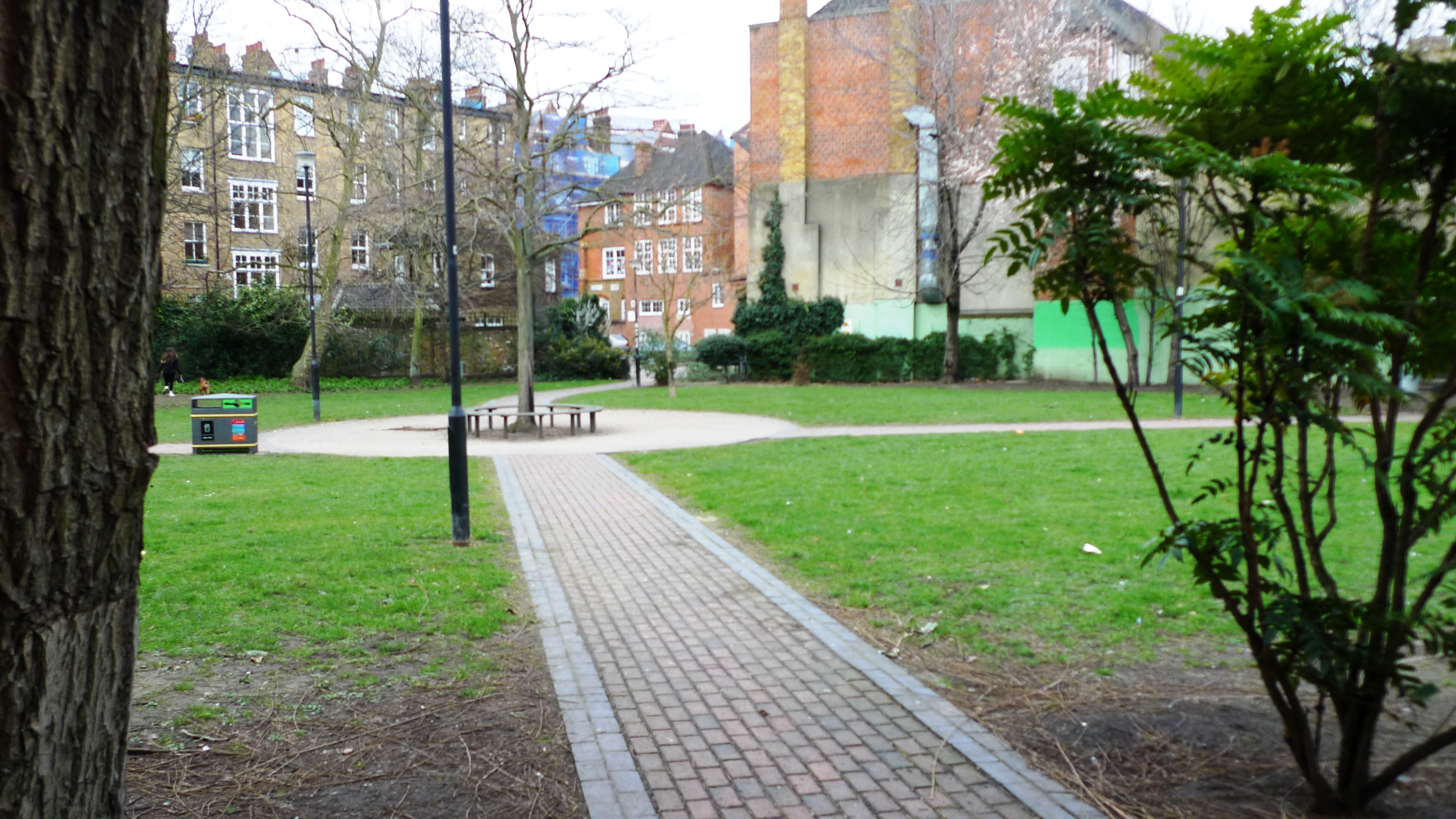
- Marcus Garvey Park

- Location within London Borough of Hammersmith and Fulham
- Type: Public Park
- Location: Hammersmith and Fulham, London, England
- Nearest city: London
- OS grid: TQ244788
- Coordinates: 51.4945377°N 0.2063633°W
- Area: 0.63 hectares (1.6 acres)
- Created: 1987
- Operator: London Borough of Hammersmith & Fulham
- Status: Open year-round

Marcus Garvey Park is a 0.63-acre (0.25 ha) urban park in the London Borough of Hammersmith and Fulham, near Kensington Olympia.

The park opened in 1987, named after black civil rights activist and Hammersmith resident Marcus Garvey. The park splits off into two sections. The first contains an open space with seating and a wooded area. The second contains a children's play area and a football/basketball court.

== History ==
After the Second World War, the site was an area of prefab temporary social housing and then was used as a multistorey car park. In 1987, the site was converted to green space to mark the centenary of the birth of Jamaican political activist Marcus Garvey, who lived close by in Talgarth Road from 1933-40. The site was opened by Janet Adegoke, Mayor of the London Borough of Hammersmith & Fulham.

On 26 June 2010, a new playground was opened by Adronie Alford, Mayor of the London Borough of Hammersmith & Fulham.

In July 2019, commissioned by Hammersmith and Fulham London Borough Council and supported by a grant from Transport for London, artist Jacob V Joyce painted a mural 2 metres (6.6 ft) wide and 4 metres (13 ft) showing children hopscotching through symbols and figures from black history.

In 2022, the park was included on the Hammersmith & Fulham Black history trail.
