= 1899 Hammersmith Vestry election =

1899 UK local government election

- 30 May 1899

25 of 72 seats to the Hammersmith Vestry
	First party	Second party
	MOD	PRO
Party	Moderate	Progressive
Last election	72 seats	0 seats
Seats won	25	0
Seats after	72	0
Seat change	Steady	Steady

The final election to the Hammersmith Vestry took place on Tuesday 30 May 1899. Vestrymen were elected for three years (to go out of office in 1902). The term was reduced to end on 1 November 1900 by the London Government Act 1899.

== Background ==
In 1899 there were 25 of the 72 seats up for re-election:

- Ward No. 1, 4 seats (out of 12)
- Ward No. 2, 7 seats (out of 18)
- Ward No. 3, 5 seats (out of 15)
- Ward No. 4, 5 seats (out of 15)
- Ward No. 5, 2 seats (out of 6)
- Ward No. 6, 2 seats (out of 6)

== Results ==
The results were as follows:

=== Ward No. 1 ===
Ward No. 1 or St Peter's and St Paul's
Party	Candidate	Votes	%	±%
Moderate	Thomas Jennings	352		
Moderate	William Goddard	322		
Moderate	James May	298		
Moderate	Edwin Faux	283		
Progressive	James Barnard	91		
Turnout				

=== Ward No. 2 ===
Ward No. 2 or St Matthew's and Brook Green
Party	Candidate	Votes	%	±%
Moderate	John Howell	259		
Moderate	George Barker	250		
Moderate	Harry Simpson	250		
Moderate	Thomas Martindill	249		
Moderate	William Williams	245		
Moderate	Ransom Hamilton	241		
Moderate	Augustus Wood	230		
Progressive	James Barnard	119		
Progressive	George Farr	86		
Turnout				

=== Ward No. 3 ===
Ward No. 3 or The Grove and Ravenscourt Park
Party	Candidate	Votes	%	±%
Moderate	James Hunt	428		
Moderate	Vincent	409		
Moderate	Alfred Ebbs	393		
Moderate	Octavius Coleman	384		
Moderate	Walter Smith	343		
Progressive	John Westcott	196		
Progressive	Richard Staton	186		
Progressive	William Beckley	177		
Progressive	James Barnard	119		
Progressive	Edward Smith	93		
Progressive	George Farr	86		
Turnout				

=== Ward No. 4 ===
Ward No. 4 or St Stephen's and Starch Green
Party	Candidate	Votes	%	±%
Moderate	Owen Coker	458		
Moderate	John Bennell	457		
Moderate	Alfred Hopkins	421		
Moderate	Percy Madge	420		
Moderate	William Cubitt	383		
Moderate	James Boyle	336		
Moderate	Anthony Santo	325		
Moderate	George Howes	311		
Moderate	Archibald Murray	289		
Moderate	George Hollingshead	285		
Turnout				

=== Ward No. 5 ===
Ward No. 5 or College Park
Party	Candidate	Votes	%	±%
Moderate	Elliot	unopposed		
Moderate	Pomeroy	unopposed		
Turnout				

=== Ward No. 6 ===
Ward No. 6 or Latimer
Party	Candidate	Votes	%	±%
Moderate	Edward Holman	243		
Moderate	Peter Tinckham	219		
Progressive	Harry Courtney	196		
Progressive	George Lee	169		
