= Mayor of the Metropolitan Borough of Hammersmith =

Mayors of the Metropolitan Borough of Hammersmith (1900–1965)

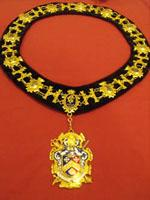
- Hammersmith mayoral chain and badge

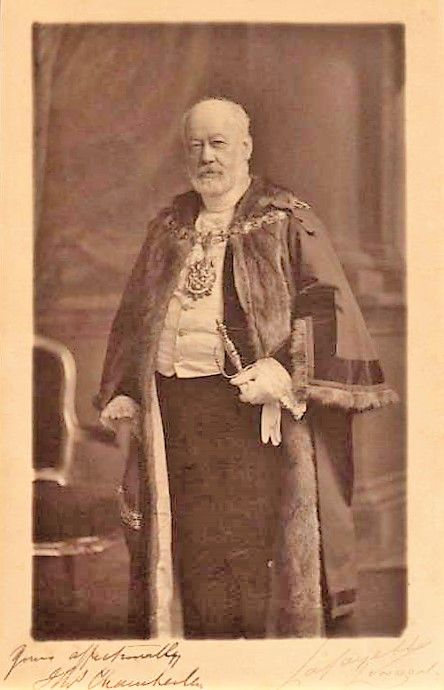
- Thomas Chamberlen, first Mayor of the Metropolitan Borough of Hammersmith (1900-1902)
- Formation: 1990
- First holder: Thomas Chamberlen
- Final holder: Elizabeth O'Kelly Finn
- Abolished: March 31, 1965

The Mayor of the Metropolitan Borough of Hammersmith was the mayor of the Metropolitan Borough of Hammersmith, which existed from 1900 to 1965.

== Background ==
The London Government Act 1899 reformed the administration of London by dividing the County of London into 28 metropolitan boroughs, replacing the 41 parish vestries and district boards of works administering the area. Under the terms of the London Government Act 1899, each borough was to be governed by a borough council consisting of a mayor, aldermen and councillors.

On 15 May 1990, by the "Borough of Hammersmith in Council, 1900" Order in Council, the Metropolitan Borough of Hammersmith was formed from the civil parish of Hammersmith, and the Hammersmith Metropolitan Borough Council (formally "The Mayor, Aldermen and Councillors of the Metropolitan Borough of Hammersmith") was established and incorporated as a body corporate.

The London Government Act 1963 created Greater London, divided into 32 London boroughs, abolishing civil parishes in London. On 30 March 1965, The London Government Order 1965 was laid before the house, to effect the changes.

On 1 April 1965, the Metropolitan Borough of Hammersmith ceased to exist and merged with the Metropolitan Borough of Fulham to form the London Borough of Hammersmith. The Hammersmith Metropolitan Borough Council was succeeded by the Hammersmith London Borough Council.

On 1 April 1979, the borough was renamed to the London Borough of Hammersmith and Fulham and the council was renamed to the Hammersmith and Fulham Borough Council.

== Insignia ==
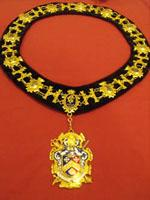
Hammersmith mayoral chain and badge

The mayoral chain and badge were provided by public subscription and presented to the council on subscriber's behalf by William Bull, Member of Parliament for Hammersmith. It was made by the Goldsmiths' & Silversmiths' Company and designed by Councillor Sir William Blake Richmond. The chain is made of 18 carat gold, consisting of alternate linking letter Hs, crossed hammers and ornamental shields for engraving the names of successive Mayors. The badge, consisting of a gold and enamelled replica of the coat of arms of Hammersmith Metropolitan Borough, is suspended from a centre link bearing the initials of the first mayor, Thomas Chamberlen, and the date 1900.

== List of mayors ==
The mayors from 1900 to 1965 were:

| Councillor | From | To |
|---|---|---|
| Thomas Chamberlen | 1900 | 1902 |
| Acton Phillips | 1902 | 1903 |
| Charles Pascall | 1903 | 1904 |
| Joseph Morris Levy | 1904 | 1905 |
| James Joseph Raynor Green | 1905 | 1906 |
| Edmund Charles Rawlings | 1906 | 1907 |
| Samuel Bewsher | 1907 | 1908 |
| Richard Johnson Walker | 1908 | 1909 |
| Samuel Bewsher | 1909 | 1910 |
| Norman William Shairp | 1910 | 1911 |
| Frank Mayle | 1911 | 1912 |
| Samuel Dawson Leah | 1912 | 1913 |
| Henry Foreman | 1913 | 1920 |
| Marshall Hays | 1920 | 1925 |
| Charles Pascall | 1925 | 1926 |
| Bertie Jonathan Samels | 1926 | 1929 |
| Edwin Joseph Benjamin Spearing | 1929 | 1931 |
| Walter Pierce Davies | 1931 | 1933 |
| Arthur Belsham | 1933 | 1935 |
| John Rooke | 1935 | 1937 |
| William Henry Church | 1937 | 1939 |
| Wilfrid Turney | 1939 | 1940 |
| Richard Henry Kent | 1940 | 1942 |
| Edward Ernest Woods | 1942 | 1944 |
| Frederick Brader | 1944 | 1946 |
| Reginald James Buckingham | 1946 | 1949 |
| Frank Laurence Hewett | 1949 | 1951 |
| William Henry Brind | 1951 | 1953 |
| Henry George Reynolds | 1953 | 1955 |
| Thomas Antony Keating | 1955 | 1957 |
| John Frederick Heaks | 1957 | 1959 |
| John Francis Hayes | 1959 | 1961 |
| Edith Christina Woods | 1961 | 1963 |
| Stanley Moss Atkins | 1963 | 1964 |
| Elizabeth O'Kelly Finn | 1964 | 1965 |
