= Hammersmith Park =

Park in Shepherd's Bush, London, England

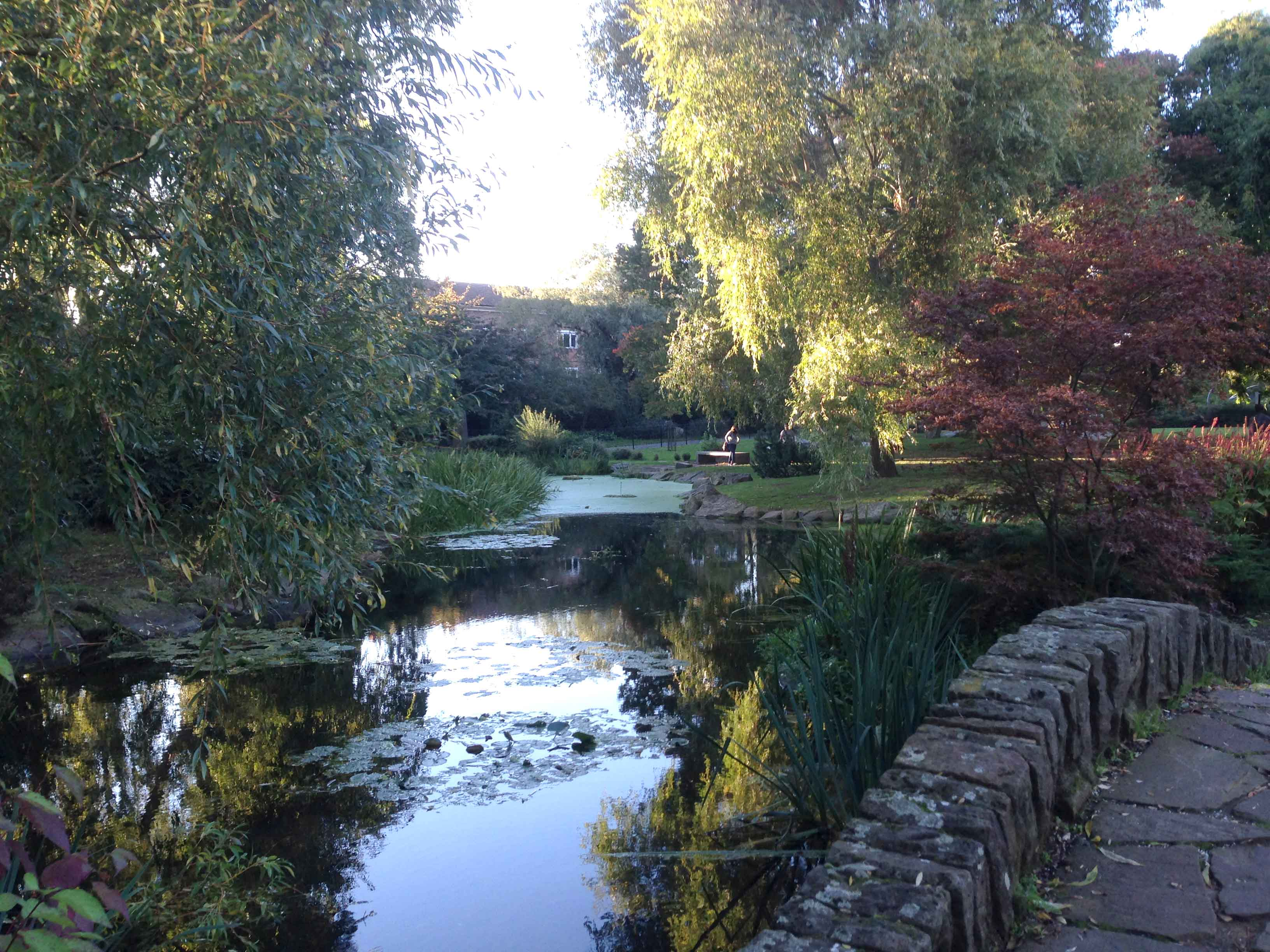
- Hammersmith Park

- Location within London Borough of Hammersmith and Fulham
- Location: Hammersmith and Fulham, London, England
- OS grid: TQ 23068049
- Coordinates: 51°30′36″N 0°13′41″W
- Operator: London Borough of Hammersmith and Fulham

Hammersmith Park, known to many locals as "The BBC Park" is a public park in the London Borough of Hammersmith and Fulham. It includes a Japanese Garden, a gated children's play area, tennis courts and football pitches run by Powerleague. Despite its name, the park is located in Shepherd's Bush, not Hammersmith.

== History ==
=== Origins ===
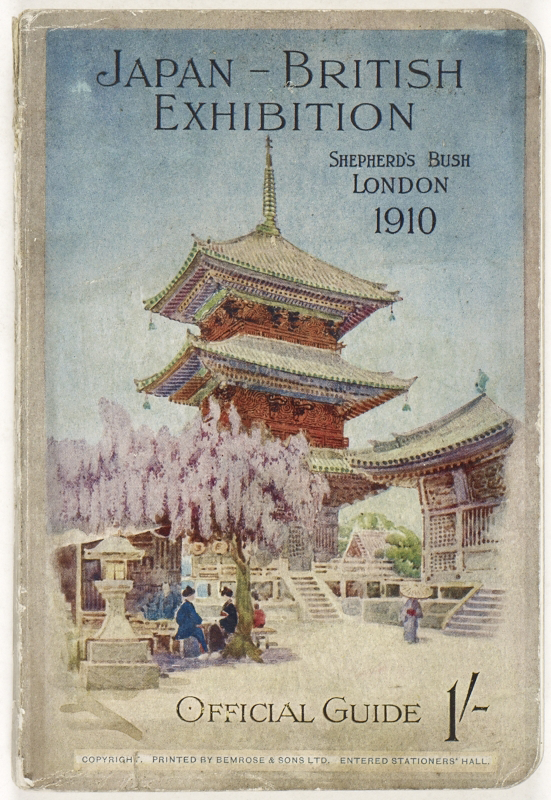
Postcard from the Japan-British Exhibition of 1910

Hammersmith Park is sited on the remains of an original Japanese garden designed for the Japan–British Exhibition in 1910. The area, known as the Great White City, was initially developed for 1908 Summer Olympics and was subsequently used for a series of international exhibitions until World War I.

Little sign of the 1910 Japan–British Exhibition remains today, but the Chokushimon (Gateway of the Imperial Messenger, a four-fifths replica of the Karamon of Nishi Hongan-ji in Kyoto) was moved to Kew Gardens in 1911, where it still can be seen.

=== 1950s ===
In November 1954 tennis courts and a playground were added. The remainder of the park opened in September 1955.

== Hammersmith Park today ==
The Garden of Peace remains intact within Hammersmith Park; it was restored in 2008. The garden is set among bamboo and pagoda trees, and consists of two large ponds which are linked by a stone bridge. Rocks surround the garden, forming a small waterfall. A number of the original plants and trees brought from Japan in 1909 still survive.

In 2013 the London Borough of Hammersmith and Fulham announced plans, initially proposed in 2011, to demolish the existing sports facilities and replace them with football pitches, run by Powerleague. Despite opposition from some local residents, led local author and journalist Virginia Ironside, seeking judicial review of the decision on the basis of inadequate public consultation, the plans went ahead.

In 2018, the Japan Society and Embassy of Japan, with support of local and Japanese businesses, added an authentic Japanese gateway and avenue of traditional Japanese stone lanterns to the park.

In 2020 Hammersmith Park's Japanese Garden ranked No 9 in a "Tranquility Index" of London.

== Gallery ==
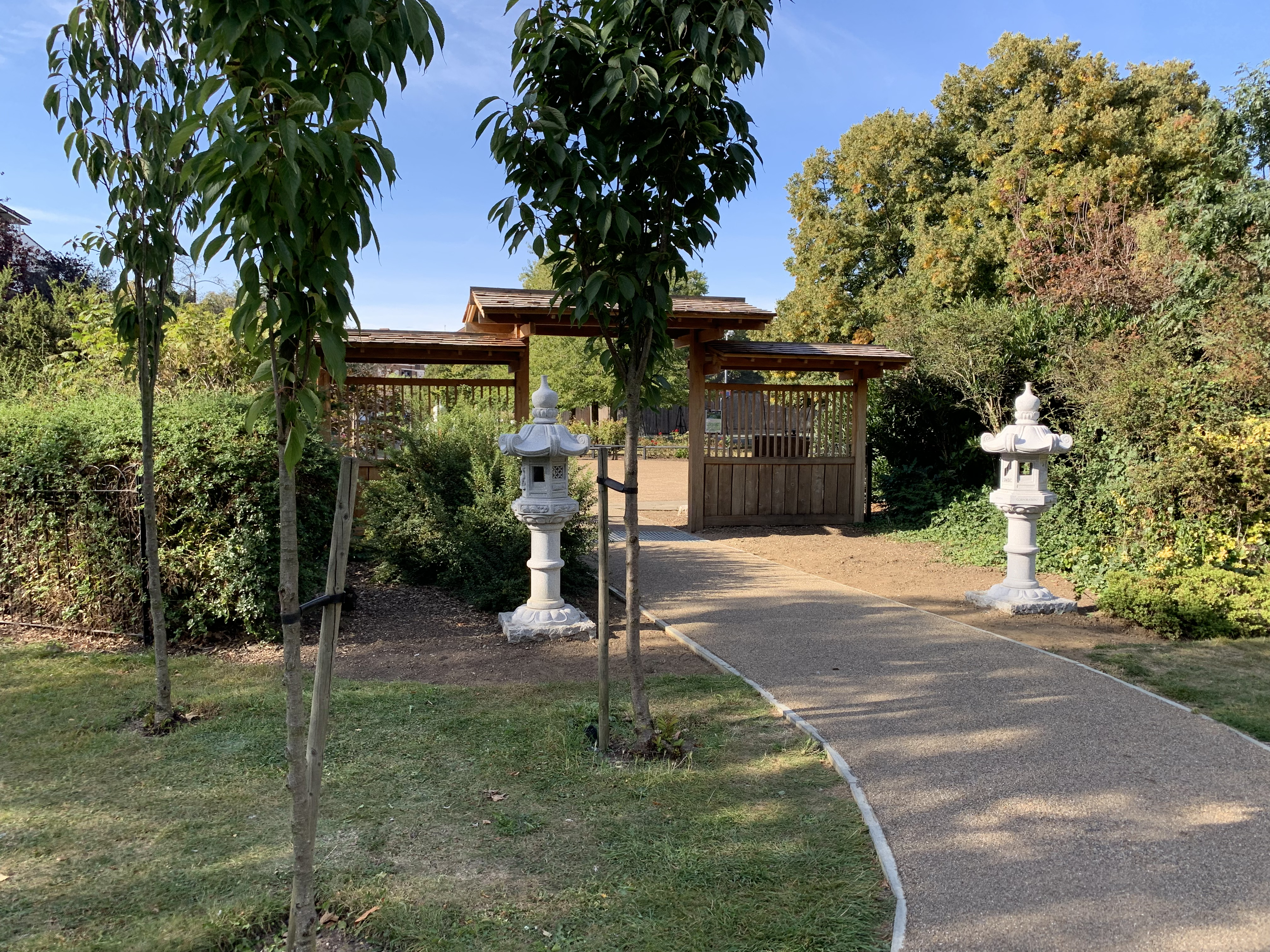
Hammersmith Park Japanese Gateway, September 2019

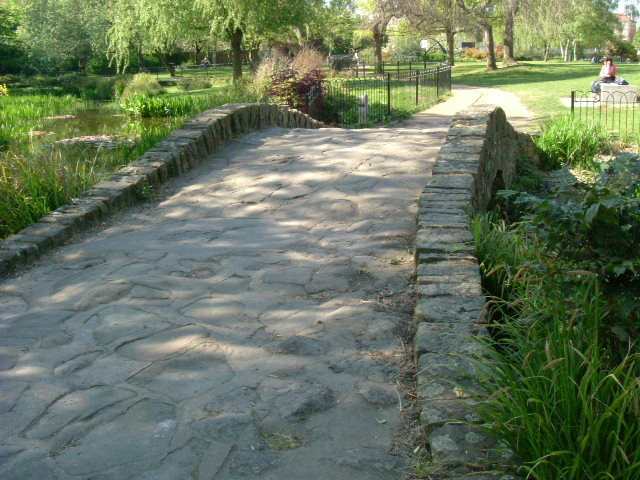
Bridge in Japanese Garden at Hammersmith Park

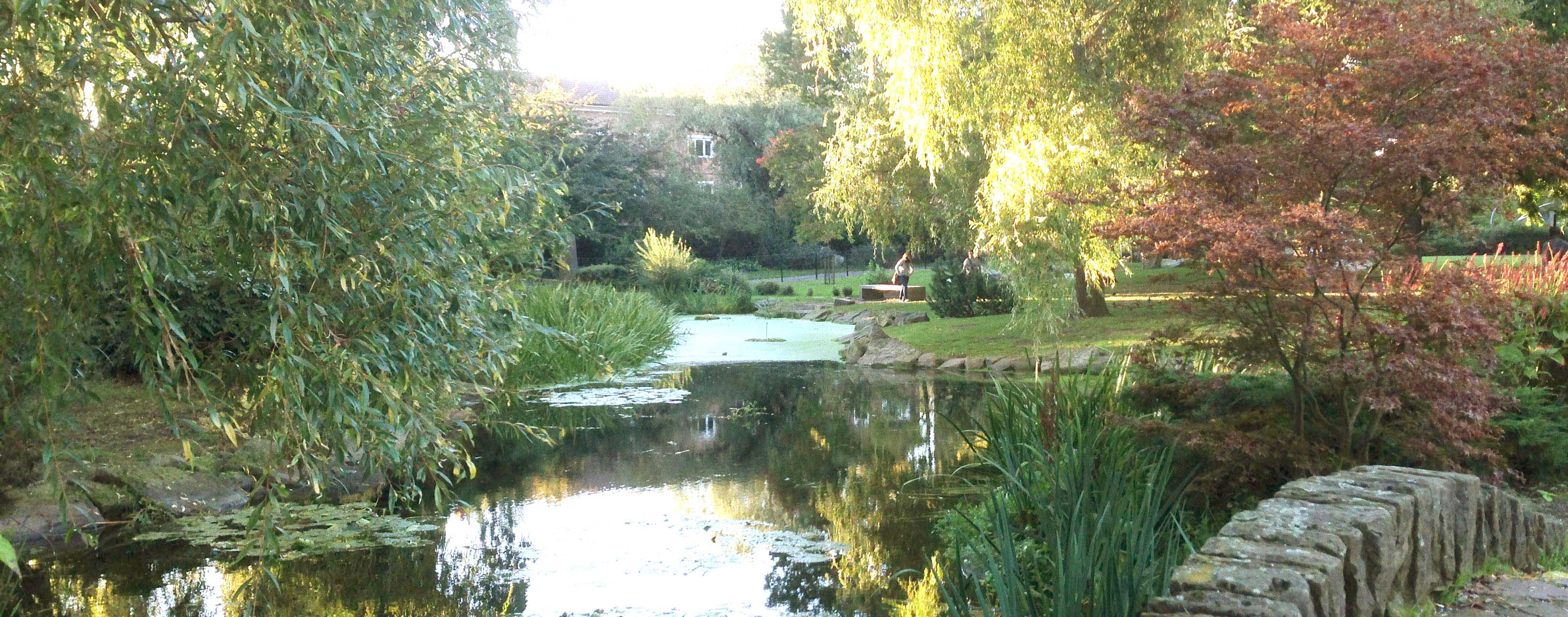
Japanese Garden at Hammersmith Park

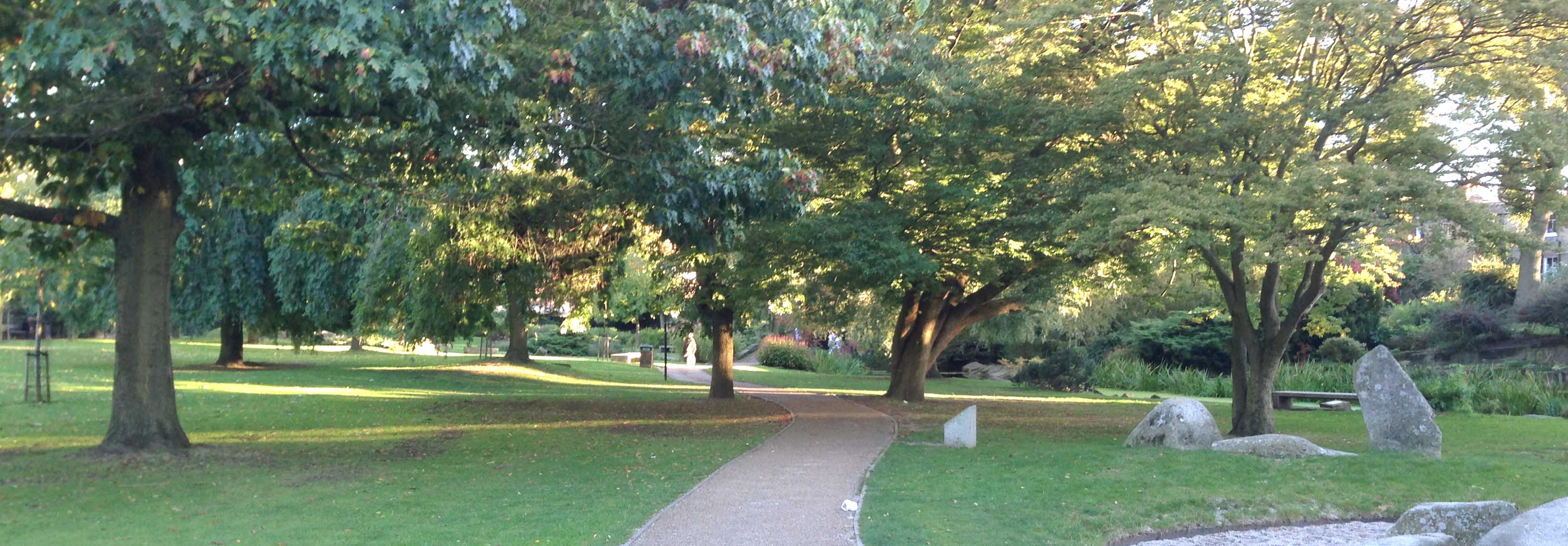
Trees at Hammersmith Park

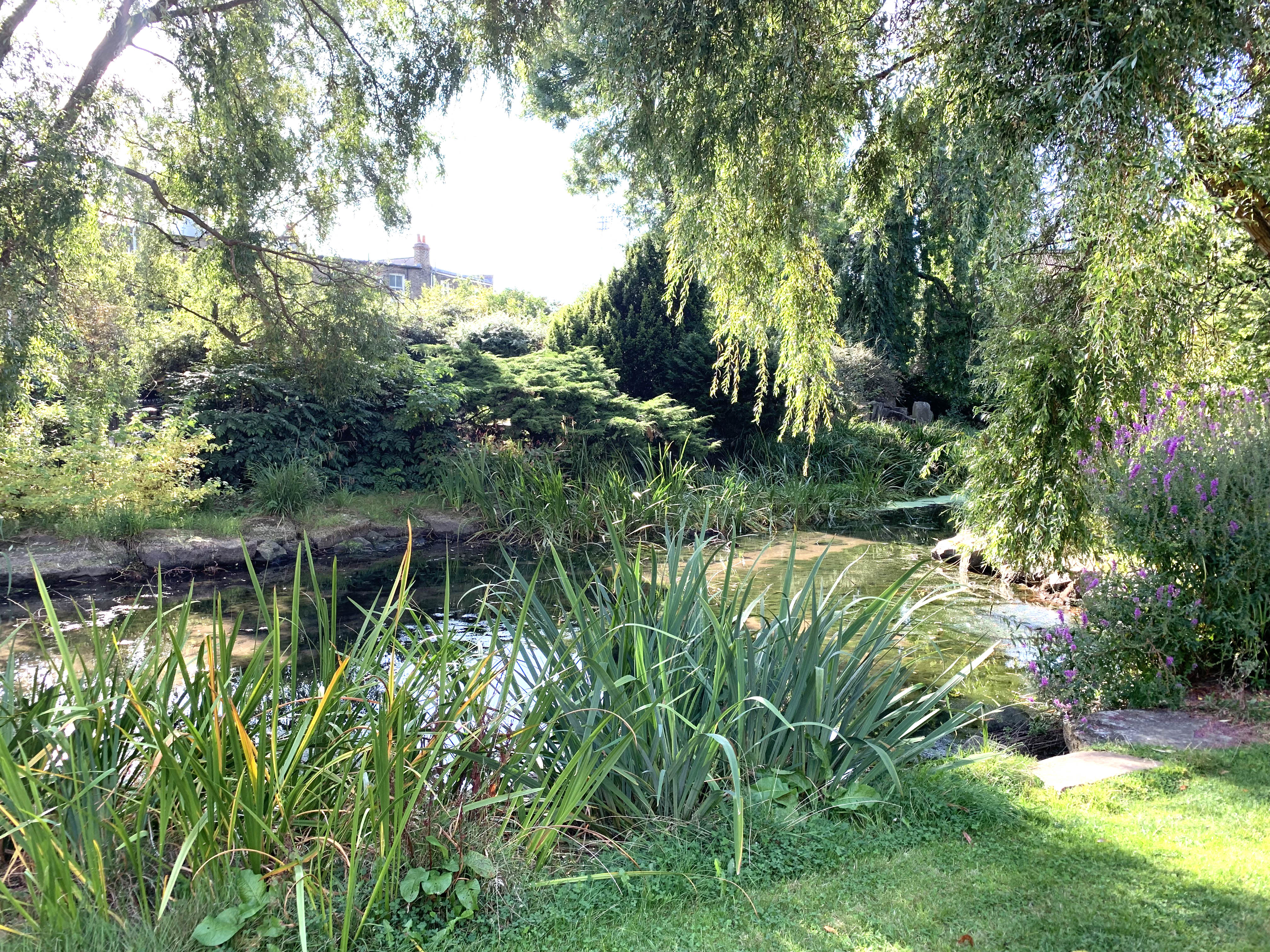
Japanese Garden at Hammersmith Park

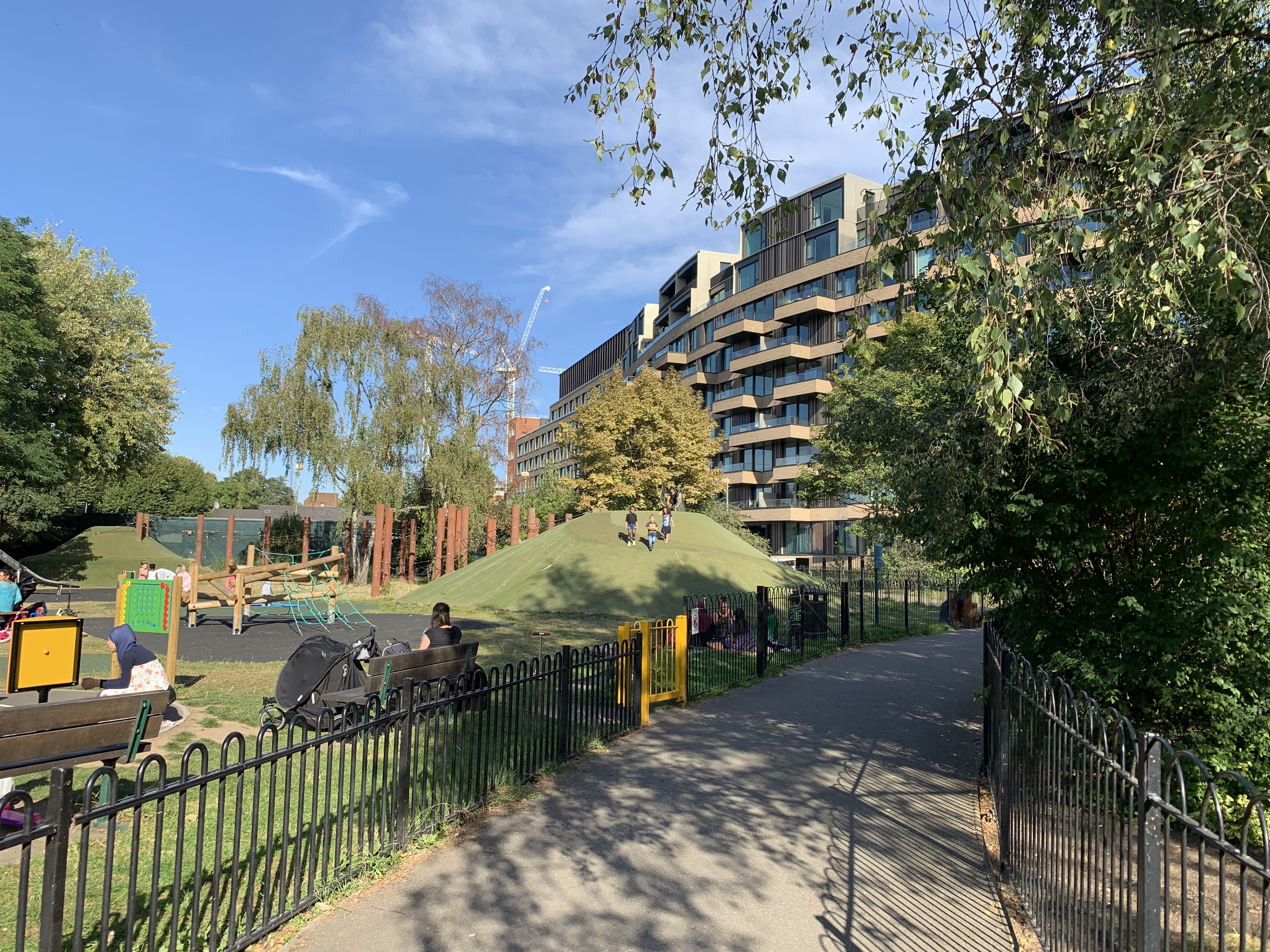
View of TV Centre at Hammersmith Park

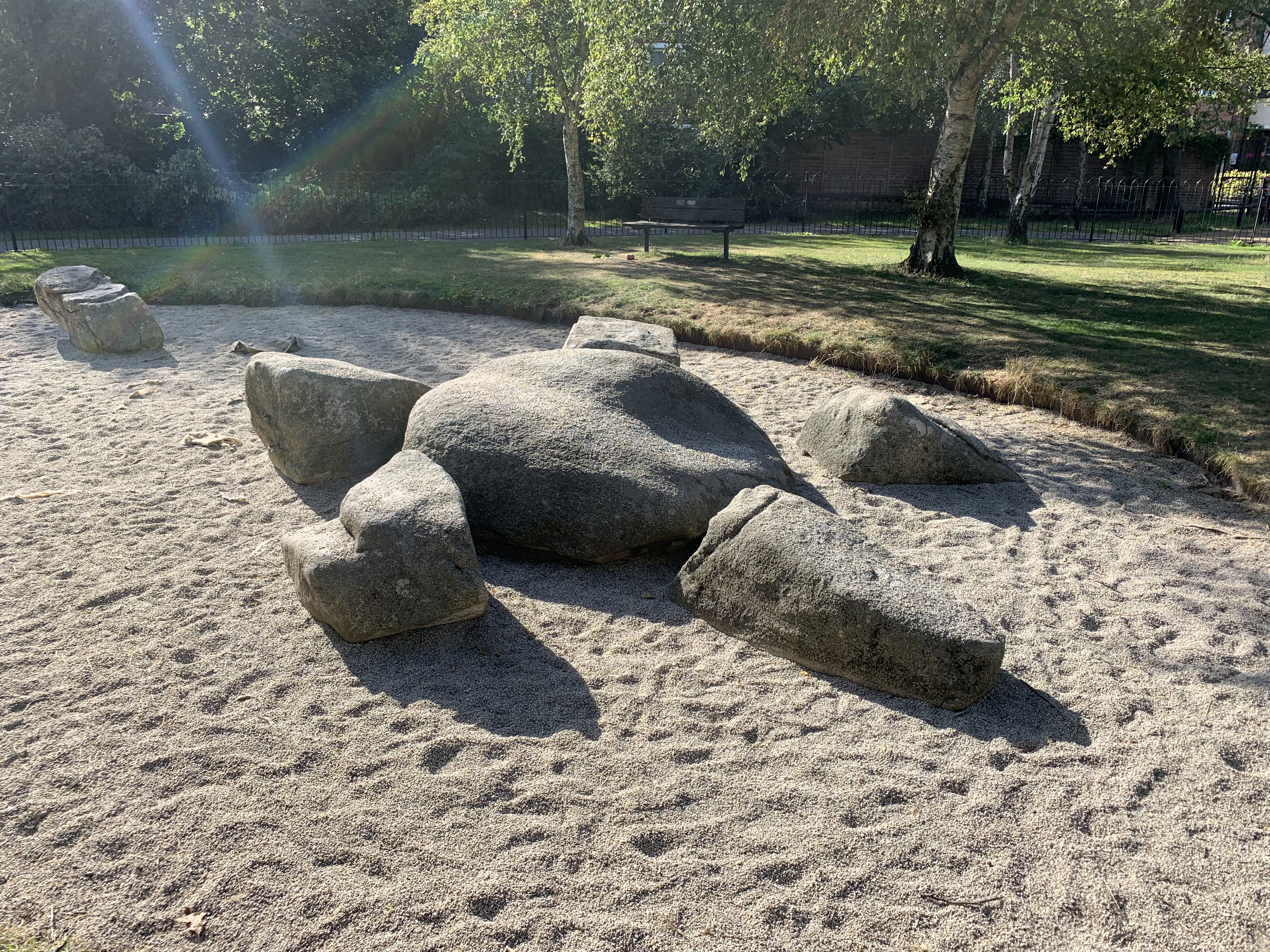
Turtle play area at Hammersmith Park

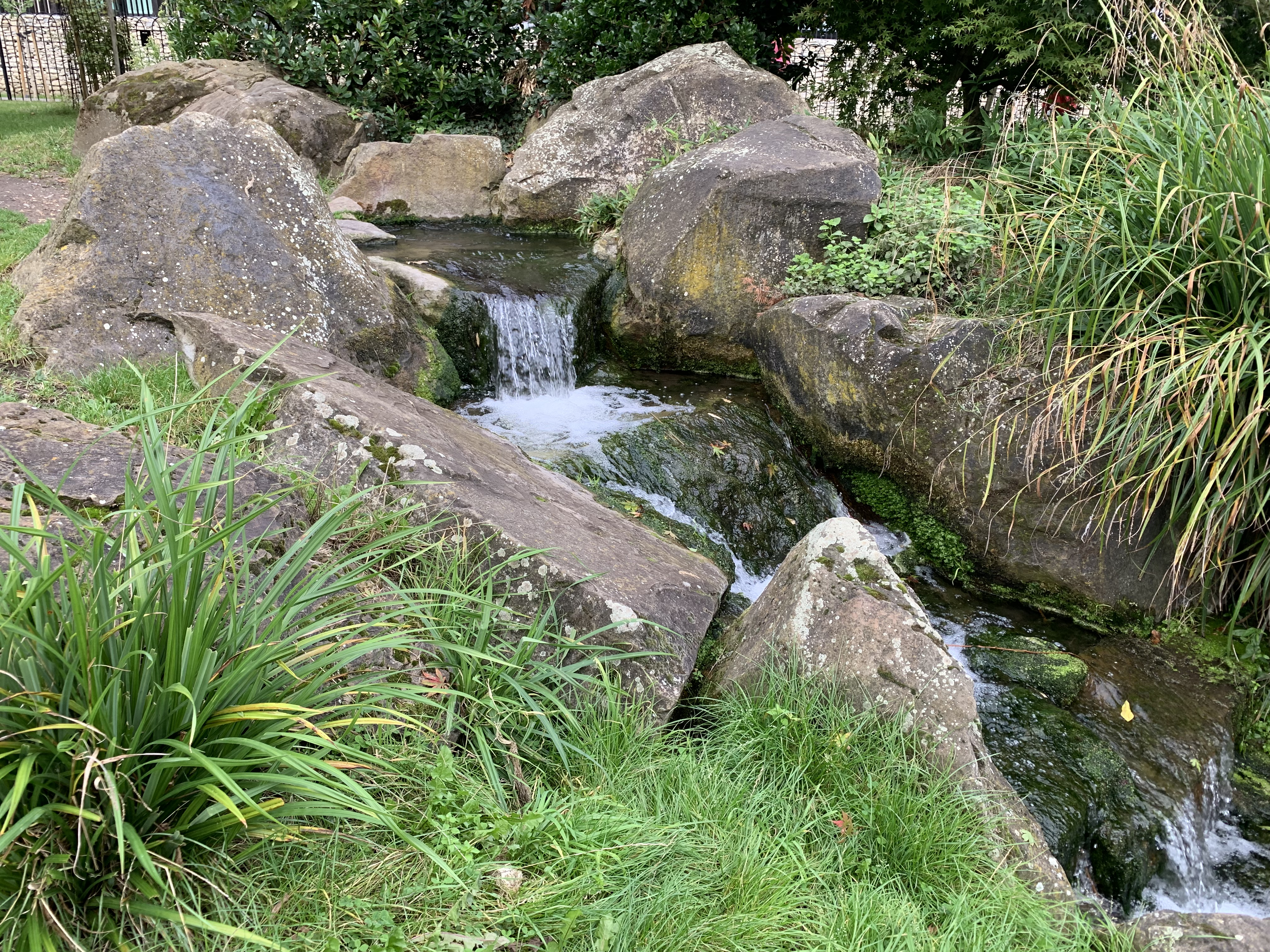
Waterfall in the Japanese Garden

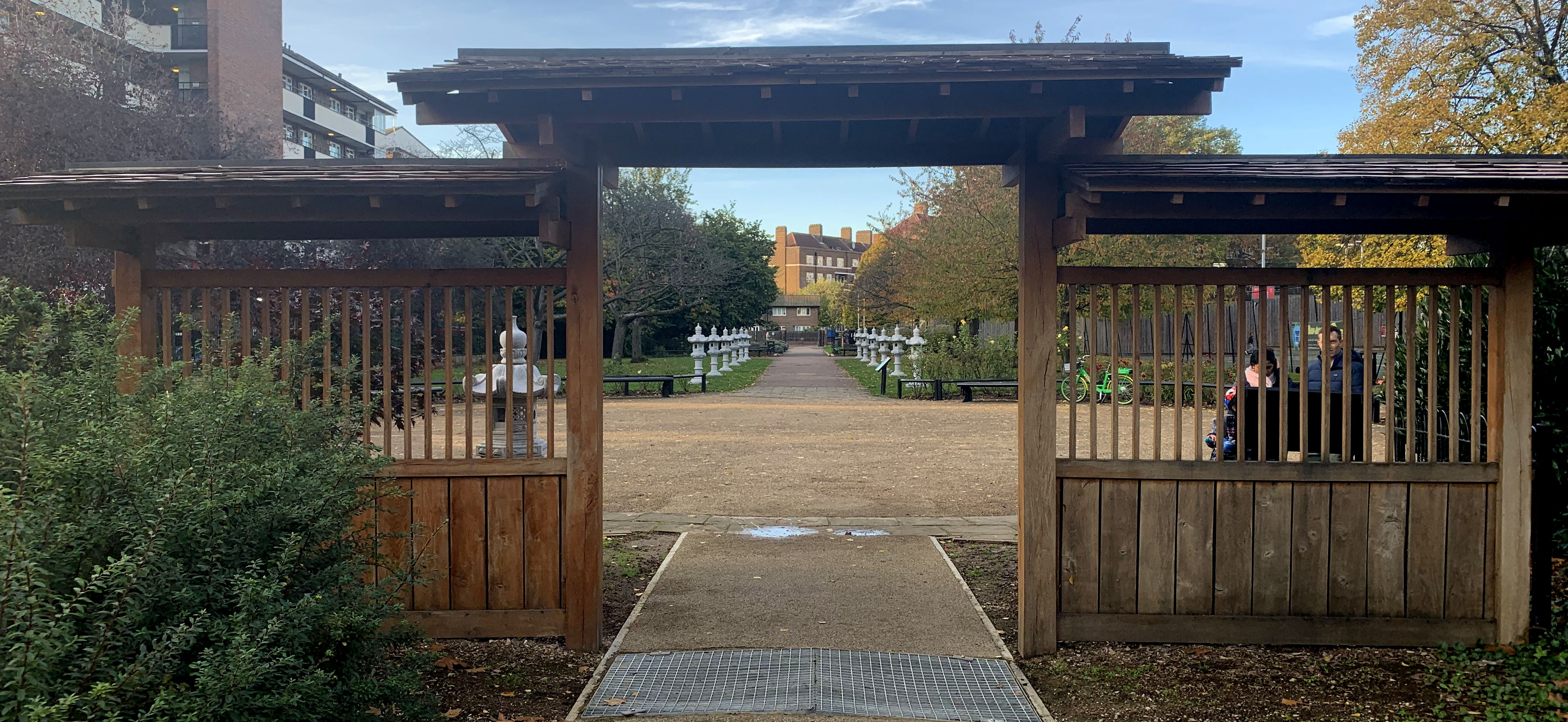
Japanese Gate at Hammersmith Park

== See also ==
- Cathnor Park
- Ravenscourt Park
- Shepherd's Bush Green
