= Thomas Chamberlen =

Metropolitan borough of the County of London

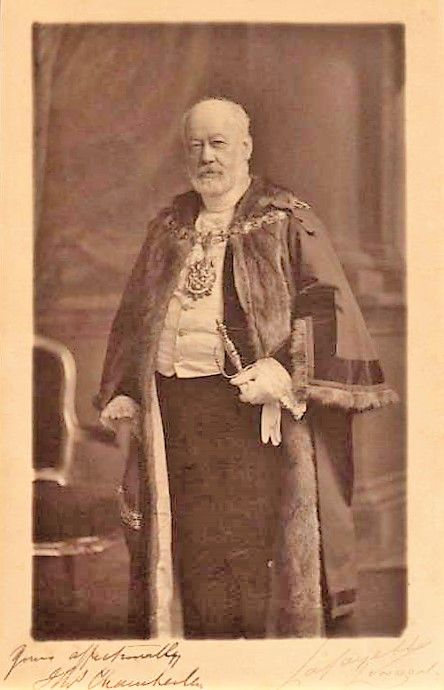

1st Mayor of the Metropolitan Borough of Hammersmith
- In office 1900–1902
- Succeeded by: Acton Phillips

Personal details
- Born: 9 February 1842
- Died: 12 August 1912; Hammersmith, London, England
- Resting place: Margravine Cemetery, Hammersmith
- Spouse: Emma Chamberlen

Thomas Chamberlen (9 February 1842 – 12 August 1912) was a British builder and politician who served as the first Mayor of the Metropolitan Borough of Hammersmith from 1900 to 1902.

== Career ==
Chamberlen entered local politics in 1872 as member of both Hammersmith Vestry. In June 1884, Chamberlen was elected to the Fulham District Board of Works, serving on the board, the General and Sanitary Committee, Finance Committee, Works Committee, Cartage Committee, Special Committee, Joint Committee, Law and Parliamentary Committee, Letting Committee and Sub-Cartage Committee, Sub-Works Committee and Sub-Joint Committee. Chamberlen also served on the Burial Board for Hammersmith.

From 1882 to 1891, Chamberlen Brothers built St Paul's Church in Hammersmith, designed by architects were J. P. Seddon and H. R. Gough.

In 1895, Chamberlen Brothers reconstructed the Lyric Theatre. in Hammersmith.

From 1891 to 1987, Chamberlen was a commissioner of the Hammersmith Public Library.

In 1900, Chamberlen was unanimously chosen as the borough's first mayor on 16 November 1900. He served two terms from 1900 to 1902.

== Death and legacy ==
Chamberlen died on 12 August 1912 in Hammersmith, London. Chamberlen was buried in Margravine Cemetery, Hammersmith at a funeral on 15 August 1912 attended by family, Councillor Frank Mayle, Mayor of Hammersmith and members of the Hammersmith Constitutional Club, the West London Philanthropic Society and the Hammersmith and Arthur Williams Masonic Lodge, as well as a number of residents. The Union Jack at Hammersmith Town Hall was placed at half-mast

Known to some as the "father of Hammersmith", Chamberlen's is commemorated on the Hammersmith Mayoral chain and badge through a centre link bearing his initials. A brass plaque commemorates Chamberlen in St Paul's Church, Hammersmith.
