= South Park, Fulham =

Park in London, England

Coordinates: 51°28′9″N 0°11′37″W

South Park is a 7.9 hectare park in the London Borough of Hammersmith and Fulham. South Park contains a public cricket pitch, tennis courts, football pitches, netball and basketball courts. In addition there is a large children's playground fenced off from the main park and a 1 km perimeter walk used by runners, walkers, dogs and their owners. Many people enjoy South Park for its unique trees and well maintained gardens. A nursery for 2-5 year olds operates out of the cricket pavilion.

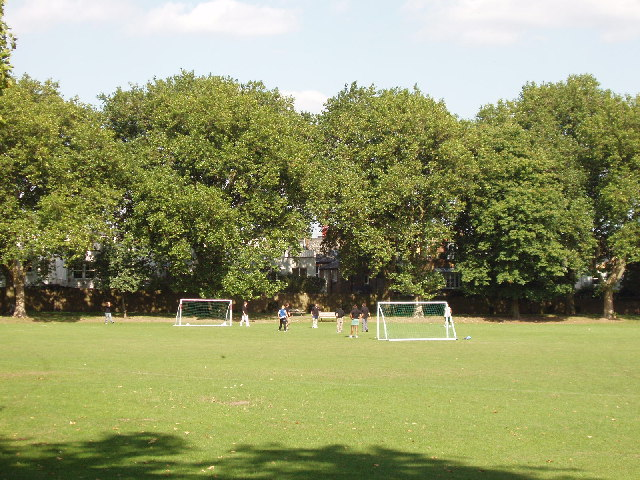
South Park, Fulham

== History ==
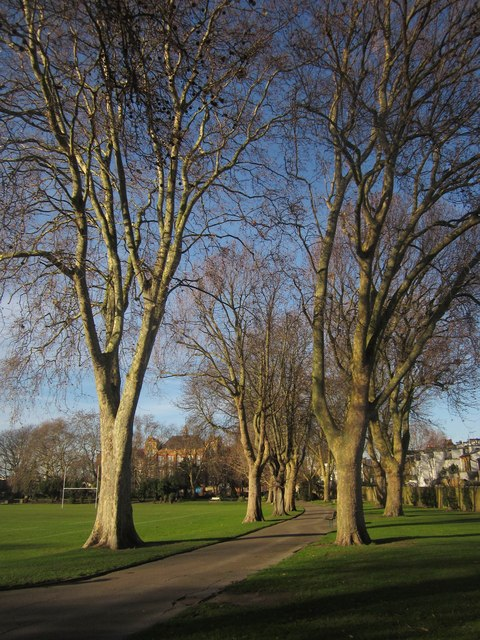
Trees in South Park.

South Park opened on 24 May 1904 after local benefactress Charlotte Sulivan, the niece of Lord Palmerston, sold the land to Fulham Borough Council for use as a public recreation ground.

The land was formerly known as Broom House Farm and Southfields Farm. The land had been part of the Sulivan private lands though it had been leased to Messrs Veithch & Sons of Chelsea as a nursery for fruit trees.

When South Park opened in March 1904, it was described in the local newspaper as "Possessing over 20 acres, cricket, tennis, plus other open air games were offered and there was a bandstand, refreshment pavilion, ladies and gentleman's lavatories and a shelter." The report also said that a gymnasium ( ¾ acre in extent) fitted with complete apparatus was at the Hugon Road corner. There is no evidence of any structure in this part of the park and it is believed that the gymnasium was an open area which might not have been uncommon at that time. This area is now an enclosed hard court games zone.

South Park's first park-keeper was John Eckett who lived in the gardener's lodge whilst Miss Gertrude Eckett, is noted as being at the refreshment room. This was in an extension to the North Lodge at the corner of Clancarty Road and Peterborough Road. The lodge is currently undergoing restoration. The refreshment room, with a conservatory extension, was used as a nursery school for a number of years. World War I saw military occupation of the park and allotments and in 1915 South Park became the training ground for three Fulham Brigades of the Royal Field Artillery. World War II, 11000 cu. yards of sand was dug from South Park and surrounds to fill sandbags needed to protect key buildings and areas. Air raid shelters were created near the present cricket pavilion. In 2004, South Park celebrated its centenary. The Mayor of Hammersmith and Fulham presented the park with some memorial benches.

== Design ==
South Park opened in 1904 after local benefactress and naturalist Ms Charlotte Sulivan sold the land to the Fulham Borough Council for use as a public recreation ground. Attached to the Sale was a covenant that the land should remain open space. The land was formerly known as Broom House Farm and Southfields Farm. The land had been part of the Sulivan private lands though it had been leased to Messrs Veithch & Sons of Chelsea as a nursery for fruit trees. World War I saw military occupation of the park and allotments and in 1915 South Park became the training ground for three Fulham Brigades of the Royal Field Artillery. World War II, 11000 cu. yards of sand was dug from South Park and surrounds to fill sandbags needed to protect key buildings and areas. Air raid shelters were created near the present cricket pavilion.

In 2004, South Park celebrated its centenary. The Mayor of Hammersmith and Fulham presented the park with some memorial benches.

== Management ==
South Park is owned by the London Borough of Hammersmith and Fulham.

== See also ==
- Hurlingham Park nearby
