= Janet Adegoke =

British Labour politician

Mayor of the London Borough of Hammersmith & Fulham
- In office May 1987 – 1 October 1987
- Preceded by: Eleanor Joan Caruana

Personal details
- Born: Janet Olufunmilayo Adegoke; 1942 Ibadan, Nigeria
- Died: October 1, 1987 Hammersmith, London, England
- Party: Labour

Janet Olufunmilayo Adegoke (1942 – 1 October 1987) was a British-Nigerian nurse and Labour Party politician. She was elected mayor of the London Borough of Hammersmith and Fulham in 1987, becoming the first Black woman to hold the position of mayor of a London borough. Adegoke died aged 45 of cancer a few months after becoming mayor.

Today, the Phoenix Fitness Centre and Janet Adegoke Swimming Pool in White City is named after Adegoke.

== Early life ==
Janet Olufunmilayo Adegoke was born in 1942 in Ibadan, a town in Nigeria. Adegoke came to England in 1961 aged 19 to study nursing. After completing her studies, Adegoke became involved in community work, advocating for improved housing and living conditions. As Secretary of the Emlyn Gardens Tenants' Association and co-founder of Hammersmith African Link, Adegoke campaigned to unite black and white communities in the borough.

== Political career ==
In the 1986 Hammersmith and Fulham London Borough Council election, Adegoke was elected to the Hammersmith and Fulham London Borough Council in the Starch Green Ward.

In May 1987, Adegoke became mayor of the London Borough of Hammersmith & Fulham.

== Personal life ==
Adegoke was a single parent and brought up three children.

== Death and legacy ==
Adegoke died aged 45 of cervical cancer in London on 1 October 1987, only months after being elected mayor.

After her death, the successor to Bloemfontein Lido, White City Pools, was renamed the Janet Adegoke Leisure Centre in 1988 until it was demolished in 2003. In 2006, a new leisure complex in White City, the Phoenix Fitness Centre and Janet Adegoke Swimming Pool, was named after Adegoke.
