= Hammersmith Metropolitan Borough Council =

Borough council of the County of London

Hammersmith Metropolitan Borough Council The Mayor, Aldermen and Councillors of the Metropolitan Borough of Hammersmith
- Coat of Arms of the Hammersmith Metropolitan Council

Type
- Type: Metropolitan borough council (London)

History
- Founded: 1990
- Disbanded: March 31, 1965
- Preceded by: Hammersmith Vestry
- Succeeded by: Hammersmith London Borough Council

Leadership
- Mayor (first): Thomas Chamberlen (1900-1902)
- Mayor (last): Elizabeth O'Kelly Finn (1964-1965)

Elections
- First election: 1900
- Last election: 1962

Meeting place
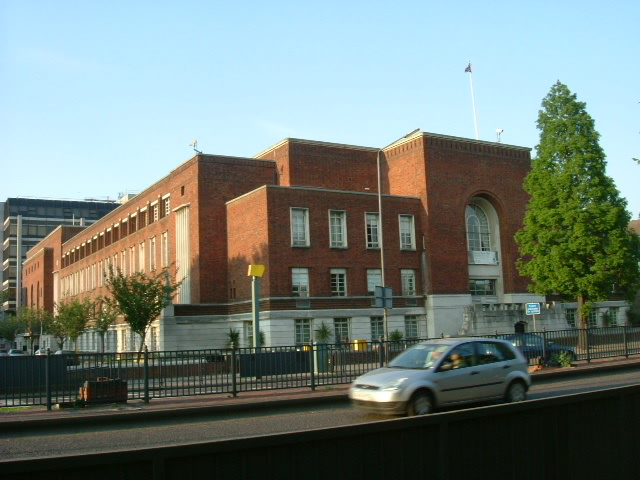
- Town Hall, King Street

The Hammersmith Metropolitan Borough Council, formally The Mayor, Aldermen and Councillors of the Metropolitan Borough of Hammersmith, was the local authority for the Metropolitan Borough of Hammersmith, which existed from 1900 to 1965.

== History ==
The London Government Act 1899 (62 & 63 Vict. c. 14) reformed the administration of London by dividing the County of London into 28 metropolitan boroughs, replacing the 41 parish vestries and district boards of works administering the area.

On 15 May 1900, by the "Borough of Hammersmith in Council, 1900" Order in Council, the Metropolitan Borough of Hammersmith was formed from the civil parish of Hammersmith, and the Hammersmith Metropolitan Borough Council (formally "The Mayor, Aldermen and Councillors of the Metropolitan Borough of Hammersmith") was established and incorporated as a body corporate, replacing the Hammersmith Vestry.

The London Government Act 1963 created Greater London, divided into 32 London boroughs, abolishing civil parishes in London. On 30 March 1965, The London Government Order 1965 was laid before the house, to effect the changes.

On 1 April 1965, the Metropolitan Borough of Hammersmith ceased to exist and merged with the Metropolitan Borough of Fulham to form the London Borough of Hammersmith. The Hammersmith Metropolitan Borough Council was succeeded by the Hammersmith London Borough Council.

On 1 April 1979, the borough was renamed to the London Borough of Hammersmith and Fulham and the council was renamed to the Hammersmith and Fulham Borough Council.

== Politics ==
Under the terms of the London Government Act 1899 (62 & 63 Vict. c. 14), each borough was to be governed by a borough council consisting of a mayor, aldermen and councillors.

=== Mayor ===
The mayor of the borough was appointed by the council.

In 1900, local builder and politician Thomas Chamberlen was unanimously chosen as the borough's first mayor on 16 November 1900. He served two terms from 1900 to 1902.
