= John Anthony Roberts =

John Anthony Roberts QC CBE (17 May 1928–26 June 2016) was a Sierra Leone-born British lawyer, claimed to be the first Queen's Counsel of African descent.

Roberts was born in Sierra Leone in 1928. His mother was a slave descendant. His father was Brazilian.

Roberts came to the UK in 1952, working with the RAF serving in different locations worldwide including Sierra Leone. He came back to the UK in 1964 and worked as a civil servant until 1969.

Roberts studied law and set up Chambers at Stone Buildings, Lincoln's Inn. He was the first African descendant to be appointed Queen's Counsel and the first Recorder of the Crown Court in England and Wales.

He died in 2016.
