= Inns of Court Regiment =

British Army regiment (1932–1961)

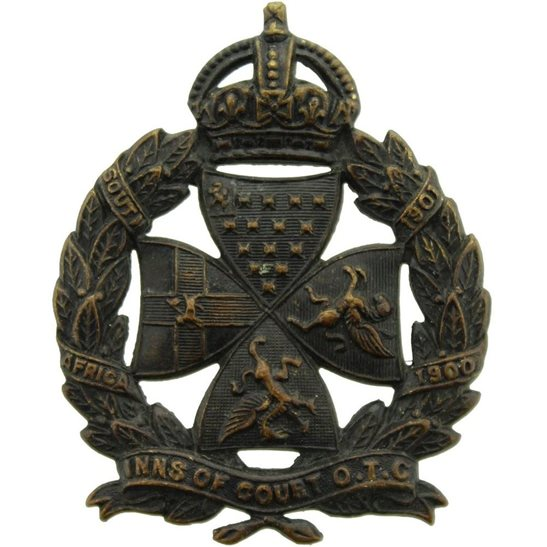
- Inns of Court OTC cap badge
- Active: May 1932 – May 1961
- Country: United Kingdom
- Branch: British Army
- Type: Infantry / Cavalry
- Garrison/HQ: 10 Stone Buildings, Lincoln's Inn
- Nickname: "The Devil's Own"

The Inns of Court Regiment (ICR) was a British Army regiment that existed under that name between May 1932 and May 1961. The unit traces its lineage back much further to at least 1584 however, and its name lives on today within 68 (Inns of Court & City and Yeomanry) Signal Squadron, as part of 71st (City of London) Yeomanry Signal Regiment.

== Early history ==
Back in the 14th to 16th centuries, judges were called upon to perform functions that, in modern times, would hardly be considered to come within judicial office. Accordingly, members of the Inns of Court found themselves called to fight in the wars of King John or against Robert the Bruce. One such defence of Medieval London was organised in 1381 against Wat Tyler, during the Peasants' Revolt (when the Chief Justice was killed). In 1467, the Chief Justice of the Exchequer, then Recorder of the city of London, was instrumental in defeating a Lancastrian attack on the city of London. Further accounts, such as Henry Machyn's diary (1554), tell of more localised defences when "On the xij day of Juin was a gret fray be-twyn the Lord Warden's servants of Kent and the Ines of Greys Inn and Lynkolne(s) Inn, and some sleyn and hurt."

The first organised body formed by the Inns of Court appears to have been in Holborn, London, in 1584. At that time, associations known as trained bands were formed to assist in the defence of the country from the Spanish Armada. The deed itself, associating the members of Lincoln's Inn, is still in existence, having been preserved by its first signatory, Thomas Egerton, then Solicitor-General, and afterwards Lord Chancellor.

The history is ambiguous thereafter, although many lawyers were known to join the Royalists, and their clerks the Parliamentarians, during the English Civil War. Certainly, members of The Inns were called out against the Jacobite rising of 1745 and the Gordon riots of 1780. Indeed, future prime minister William Pitt the Younger served in the Lincoln's Inn Company.

== French Revolutionary and Napoleonic Wars ==
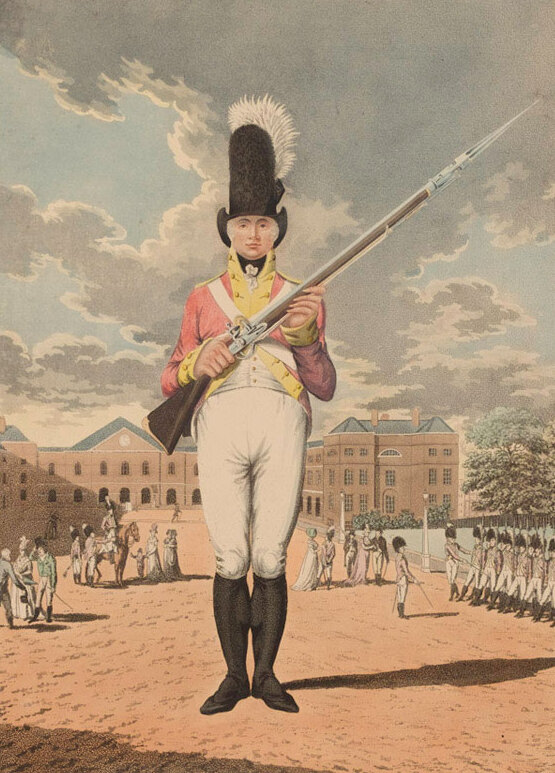
1803 engraving of a Bloomsbury and Inns of Court Volunteers private

The Bloomsbury and Inns of Court Volunteers was raised as part of the British Volunteer Corps in June 1797 during the French Revolutionary Wars. In 1803, the unit gained its enduring nickname when during a review by George III in Hyde Park the King, who disliked lawyers, nicknamed it "The Devil's Own". "It is understood that the King was in high health and excellent spirits at the time. When the 'Temple companies' had defiled before him, his Majesty enquired of Lord David Erskine, who commanded them, as lieutenant colonel, what was the composition of that corps? 'They are all lawyers, Sire,' said Erskine. 'What! What! 'exclaimed the King, 'all lawyers? all lawyers? Call them the Devil's Own, call them the Devil's Own!" "And the Devil's Own they were called accordingly."

== Volunteer Force 1859–1908 ==
The modern history of the regiment began again in 1859, shortly after Crimea, with the formation of the 23rd Middlesex (Inns of Court) Rifle Volunteer Corps. In 1881, the unit became a battalion of the Rifle Brigade and was renamed the 14th Middlesex (Inns of Court) Rifle Volunteer Corps in 1889. The regiment then formed part of the 2nd London Volunteer Brigade and the "Grey Brigade". In 1888, a mounted infantry detachment was formed and subsequently became known as "B" (M.I.) Company, and a contingent of 30 mounted infantry, 19 cyclists and a signaller joined the City Imperial Volunteers for service in South Africa during the Boer War.

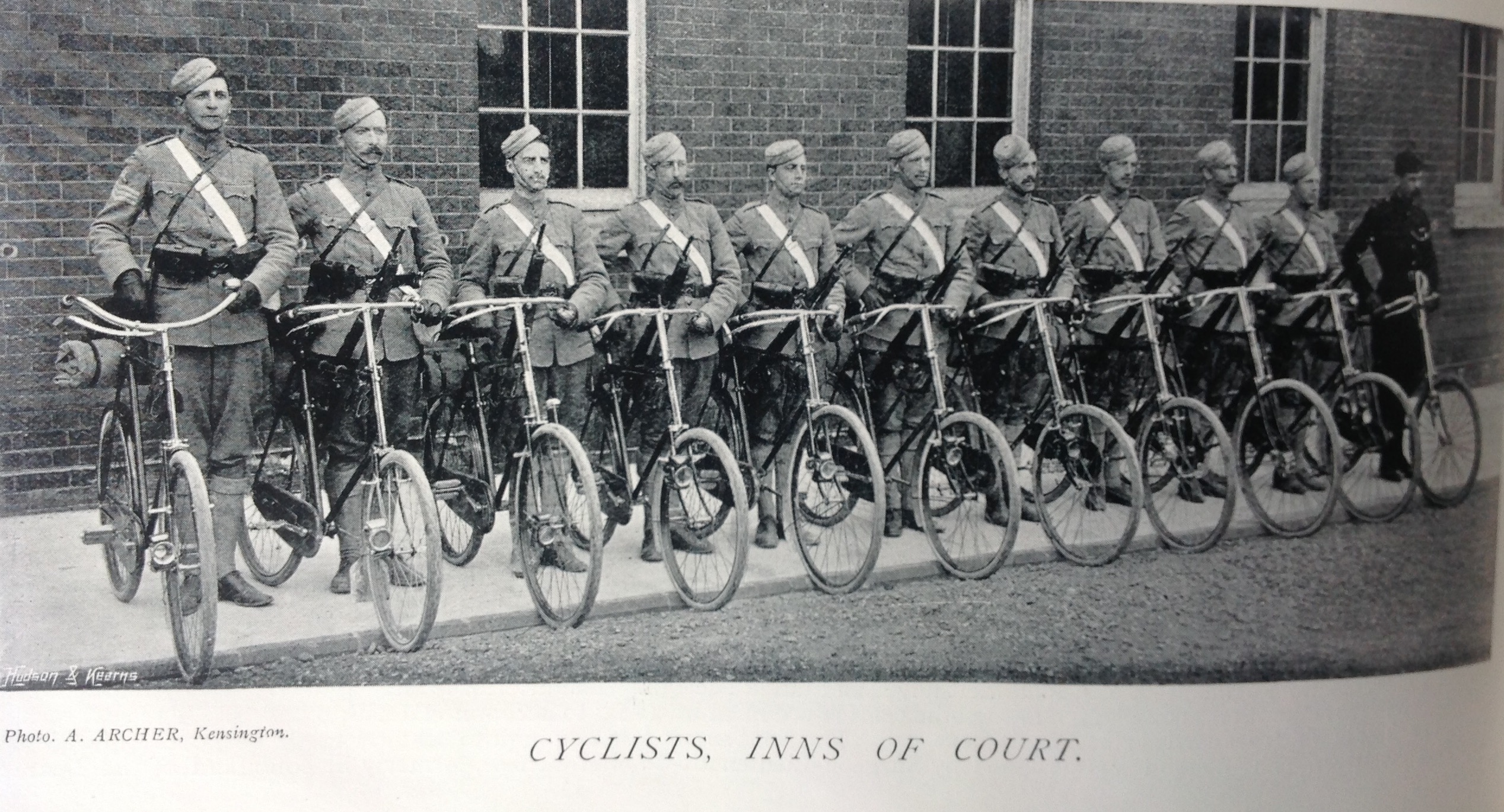
Cyclist section of 23rd Middlesex Rifle Volunteers (Inns of Court), 1897

In 1908, the Territorial Force was formed and the regiment became the 27th (County of London) Battalion, The London Regiment (Inns of Court); but almost immediately it was changed into an officer training unit under the designation the Inns of Court Officers' Training Corps (I.C.O.T.C.) The regiment had an establishment of one squadron of cavalry (I.C.O.T.C. Squadron, formerly "B" (M.I.) Company) and three companies of infantry.

== World War I ==
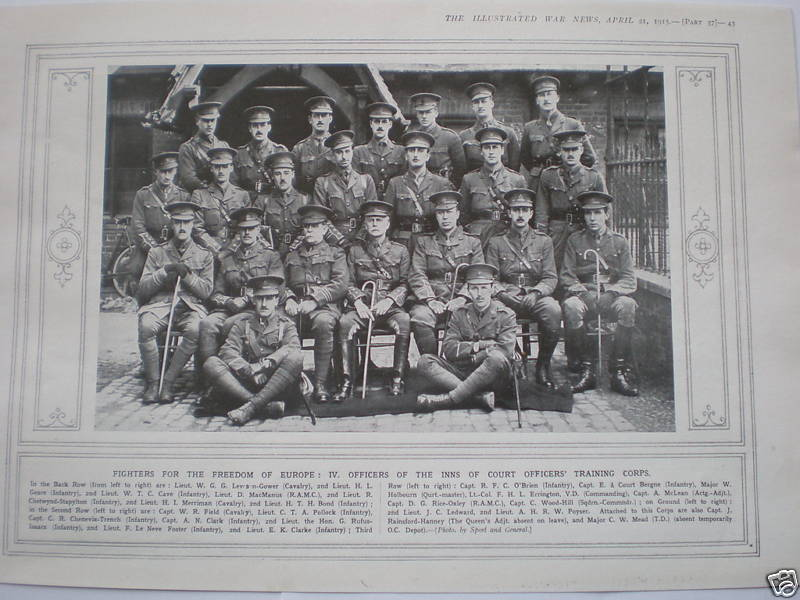
Officers of the Inns of Court OTC in 1915

In 1914, the Inns of Court Reserve Corps was formed, consisting of former members of the Inns of Court Rifle Volunteers; and in 1917 the 1st Cadet Battalion, Inns of Court, was formed to train boys under military age. The Inns of Court OTC expanded rapidly in August and September 1914, as thousands volunteered for military service following the outbreak of the First World War, and the corps quickly outgrew its peacetime premises in London. A training camp opened in tents on Berkhamsted Common, in the west of Hertfordshire in September 1914 and remained in operation until June 1919, hosting around 2,000 officer cadets. As part of their training, the men dug around 13 miles (21 km) of trenches across Berkhamsted Common, evidence of which remains visible 100 years later.

Around 11,000 were commissioned and became officers in other units. Three were awarded the Victoria Cross, all posthumously: Jack Harrison of the East Yorkshire Regiment in 1917, Walter Napleton Stone of the Royal Fusiliers in 1918 and Christopher Bushell of the Royal West Surrey Regiment in 1918. The Inns of Court Officers' Training Corps Memorial is a First World War memorial close to the temporary training camp of the corps on Berkhamsted Common. It became a Grade II listed building in November 2016.

== Reformations 1920–1940 ==
In 1920, the regiment was reformed with an establishment of one squadron of cavalry and two companies of infantry. Its designation was changed to the Inns of Court Regiment (ICR) in 1932, when it was again reorganised along similar lines. The two infantry companies were converted to light tank cavalry squadrons in 1937 and two years later formed the Royal Armoured Corps Wing, Sandhurst. In 1939, the mounted squadron joined a cavalry training regiment in Edinburgh, but this was disbanded in 1940.

== World War II ==
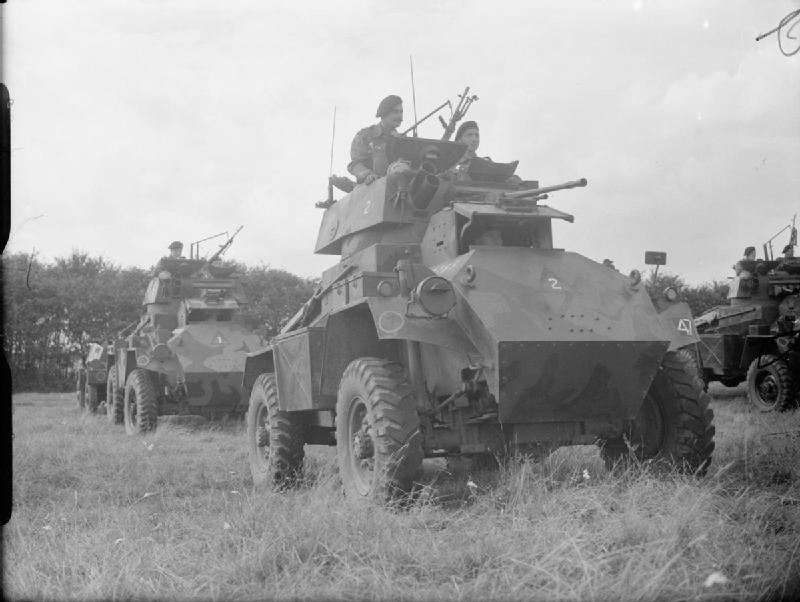
Humber Mk I armoured cars of the Inns of Court Regiment on parade at Guisborough in Yorkshire, 19 August 1941

From 23 January 1941 until 15 January 1943, the regiment was part of the 9th Armoured Division in Great Britain. From 1943, it was under the direct command of I Corps, the assault formation of 21 Army Group and later led the advance of 11th Armoured Division.

On D-Day, "C" Squadron of the regiment landed on Juno Beach with the 3rd Canadian Infantry Division. On the day, "C" Squadron was to advance inland at speed to the line of the River Orne, south of Caen, and destroy the main crossings from Thury-Harcourt to a point five kilometres south of Caen. Four crossings on the Odon were also to be prepared for demolition. The object was to halt the advance of reinforcements, particularly of the 21st Panzer Division whose presence was strongly suspected in the Forêt de Cinglais. To affect this operation, "C" Squadron was reorganised on a half-troop basis. This meant that there were twelve fighting units, to which nine had a group of Royal Engineers and a half-track of explosives attached. All vehicles were loaded on two L.C.T’s, as equally divided as possible so that, in case of loss of one, the other could still carry out the appointed role, with certain numerical limitations. “C” Squadron was to come ashore thirty minutes after the assault infantry on Juno Beach, just west of Graye-sur-Mer.

During the campaign in Northwest Europe of 1944–45, the Inns of Court, organised as an armoured car regiment, was the reconnaissance asset of I Corps.

== Reformations 1947–1969 ==
On 1 April 1947, the regiment was again reformed, as the Armoured Car Regiment of the 56th (London) Armoured Division, T.A., later to become the Reconnaissance Regiment of the 54th (East Anglian) Infantry Division. In 1956, the Northamptonshire Yeomanry was reduced to one squadron and amalgamated with the Inns of Court Regiment as "The Northamptonshire Yeomanry "D" Squadron, The Inns of Court Regiment". This was reversed when, in 1961, The Inns of Court Regiment amalgamated with the City of London Yeomanry (Rough Riders) to form The Inns of Court & City Yeomanry.

Following further defence reforms, the unit became known as 68 (Inns of Court & City Yeomanry) Signal Squadron from 1 April 1969, when, with an establishment of eight officers and 85 other ranks, it became part of the newly formed the 71 (Yeomanry) Signal Regiment (Volunteers), which itself had been formed from the recently disbanded yeomanry regiments.

== Battle honours ==
The regiment's battle honours were as follows:

- South Africa 1900–01
- The Second World War:
  - Normandy Landing · Caen · Bourguébus Ridge · Cagny · Catheolles · Amiens 1944 · Antwerp · Hechtel · Rhine · Leese · Aller · North-West Europe 1944–45

== Badge and motto ==
The cap badge combined the arms of the four Inns of Court. The Latin motto of the corps is Salus populi suprema lex (the safety of the people is the supreme law).

== Museum ==
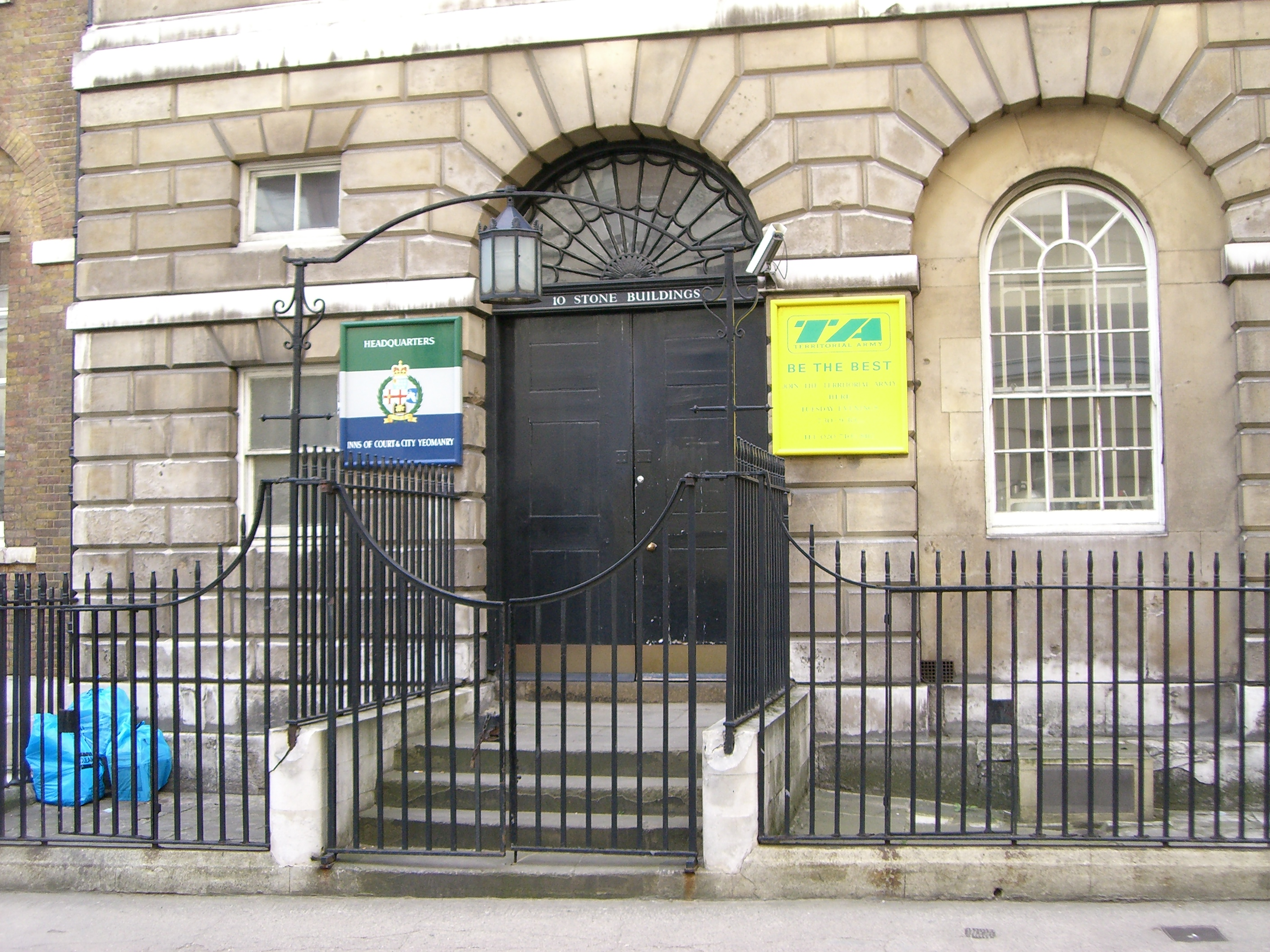
10 Stone Buildings, Lincoln's Inn, home of the Inns of Court and City Yeomanry Museum

The Inns of Court and City Yeomanry Museum is at 10 Stone Buildings, Lincoln's Inn, London, WC2A 3TG.

== Sources ==
- Bouchery, Jean (2003). From D-Day to VE-Day: The British Soldier. Paris: Histoire & Collections. ISBN 2-908182-74-2.
- Joslen, H.F (1990). Orders of Battle, Second World War 1939–1945. London: London Stamp Exchange. ISBN 0-948130-03-2.
- Norton, F.C., A short history of the military & naval services of the Inns of Court and the members of the Bench and the Bar, 1886, William Clowes & Sons, Stamford Street and Charing Cross, London
- The Inns of Court Officers Training Corps during the Great War by Francis Henry Launcelot Errington (1922).
