= Marjorie Powell =

First woman admitted to Lincoln's Inn

- Born: Marjorie Eve Powell; 5 October 1893; Market Drayton, Shropshire, England
- Died: 6 December 1939 (aged 46); Cambridge, England
- Other name: Marjorie Robinson
- Education: Orme Girls' School; Newnham College, Cambridge
- Known for: The first woman admitted to Lincoln's Inn.
- Spouse: Harold Robinson (m. 1920)
- Children: 2

Marjorie Eve Powell (5 October 1893 – 6 December 1939) was a lecturer and academic, best known for having been the first woman admitted to Lincoln's Inn.

== Early life ==
Powell was born on 5 October 1893 in Market Drayton into a farming family. She attended the Orme Girls' School (now merged into the Newcastle-under-Lyme School) before attending Newnham College, Cambridge, where she studied economics.

== Career ==
After her time at Newnham College, Powell taught at Queen's University Belfast starting in 1916 as deputy for Hugh Meredith, a professor of economics, before leaving in 1918 to go to Victoria University of Manchester to work as an assistant lecturer in political economy. In December 1919, the Sex Disqualification (Removal) Act 1919 became law; one of its provisions allowed women to become solicitors. Less than a month later, Powell became the first woman ever admitted to Lincoln's Inn, one of the four Inns of Court in London. She was never called to the bar, instead continuing to teach and write about economics.

When Powell's husband, physicist Harold Roper Robinson, went to work at the Cavendish Laboratory in Cambridge in 1921, Powell moved with him and became director of studies in economics at her alma mater, Newnham College, Cambridge. It was during her time in this role at Newnham College that she published her most influential work, Public Finance; John Maynard Keynes provided the foreword for the work.

Powell left her job at Newnham College and moved with her husband to Edinburgh in 1923, to Cardiff in 1926, then to London in 1930, continuing her involvement in economics throughout this time. She worked as a lecturer at Birkbeck College before eventually returning to Newnham College, where she was first a visiting lecture and then, in 1937, became the director of studies in economics, remaining in that position until her death in 1939.
