= Inns of Court & City Yeomanry =

British Army unit

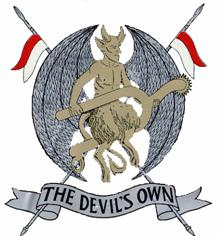
- Inns of Court & City Yeomanry insignia
- Active: 1961–present
- Country: United Kingdom
- Branch: British Army
- Type: Signals; Music
- Role: National Communications; Music support
- Size: 2 Squadrons
- Part of: Royal Corps of Signals; Royal Yeomanry
- Nicknames: The Ice Cream and Chocolate Yeomanry
- Mottos: Latin: Salus Populi Suprema Lex [our] paramount law is the wellbeing of the people
- Colours: Guidon
- March: Quick: Ballad of Nancy Dawson; Slow: Scipio (Handel)
- Mascot: The Devil with spur
- Battle honours: South Africa 1900–02; France and Flanders 1918; Gallipoli 1915; Gaza

Commanders
- Honorary Colonel: Lieutenant Colonel Vickie Sheriff, VR

Insignia
- Identification symbol: Arms of the four Inns of Court overlaid by Arms of the City of London
- Abbreviation: ICCY

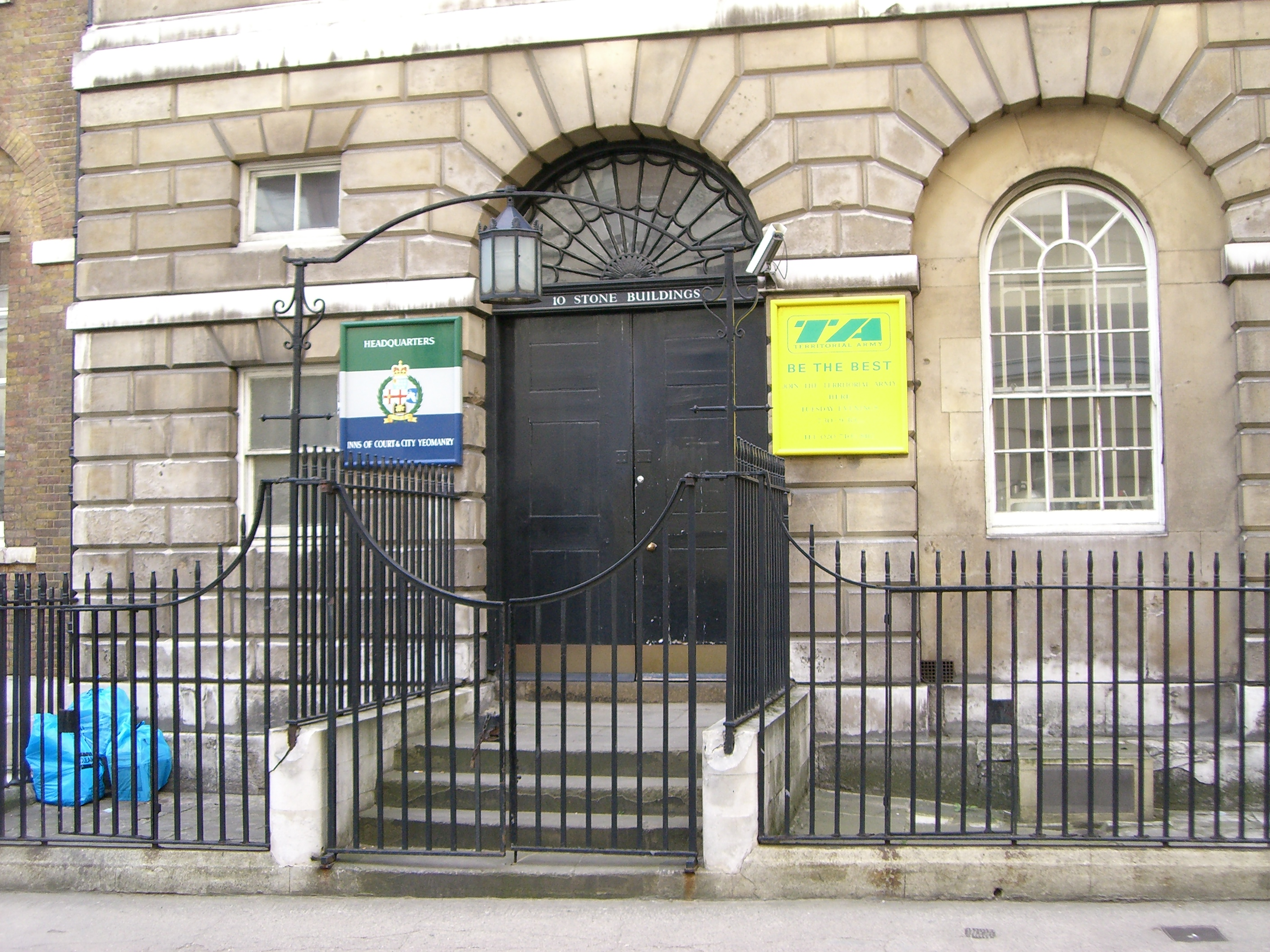
Squadron Headquarters, 10 Stone Buildings, Lincoln's Inn, London, WC2A 3TG

The Inns of Court & City Yeomanry is a British Army unit formed through the amalgamation of The Inns of Court Regiment (The Devil's Own) and The City of London Yeomanry (Rough Riders) in 1961. Its lineage is maintained by 68 (Inns of Court & City Yeomanry) Signal Squadron and the Band of the Royal Yeomanry (Inns of Court & City Yeomanry).

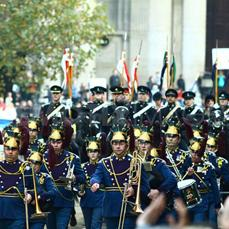
IC&CY processing in Lord Mayor's Show

== History ==
=== Foundation ===
The Inns of Court & City Yeomanry (IC&CY) was formed only in 1961, through the amalgamation of The Inns of Court Regiment (The Devil's Own) and The City of London Yeomanry (Rough Riders) but it can trace its direct roots back at least to the first written records of the former in 1584, when 95 members of The Inns of Court entered into a solemn pledge to defend Queen Elizabeth I against the threat of Spain's Armada.

Just like today, many volunteers were recruited among the legal community at times of national peril, and so it was at an inspection in Hyde Park in 1803, during the Napoleonic Wars, that George III is reputed to have styled such a litigious body as 'The Devil's Own' – a title that lives on today.

By the mid-nineteenth century, the Inns of Court Regiment (ICR) had evolved from a Volunteer Rifle Corps. The other half of the unit, The City of London Yeomanry, was raised from volunteers of the 20th Battalion Imperial Yeomanry only in the late 1890s, and served with distinction in the Second Boer War in South Africa. Its nickname, The Rough Riders, was taken from a famous body of volunteer horsemen who fought in the Spanish–American War of 1898.

=== 1960s defence reforms ===
During the period prior to 1967, the IC&CY served as an armoured car regiment (as did many other Yeomanry units). The 1967 TA reorganisation then led to the regiment being reduced to an infantry company, and assigned as A Company (Inns of Court and City Yeomanry), the London Yeomanry and Territorials.

In 1968, the London Yeomanry and Territorials was disbanded, but a cadre of the regiment, consisting of three officers and five other ranks, was retained in the Royal Armoured Corps, thereby ensuring the continuation of the Regiment's name in the Army List, and the retention of its headquarters and historical mess at Lincoln's Inn. Personnel from A Company were then used to form 68 (Inns of Court and City Yeomanry) Signal Squadron, in the newly formed 71 (Yeomanry) Signal Regiment.

=== The Home Service Force ===
A Home Service Force Squadron was badged as IC&CY and designated as 348 (IC&CY) Signals Squadron HSF from 1986 to 1993. The squadron was based at Lincoln's Inn and wore the original IC&CY cap badge. 348 Squadron was organised on the lines of an infantry rifle company and had a key point defence role. The HSF unit ran on for another 12 months as a semi-official Defence Platoon, its final parade being in 1994.

=== Merger with the Essex Yeomanry ===
Following the reorganisation of the Royal Signals Reserves in 2009, 68 (Inns of Court & City Yeomanry) Signal Squadron was merged with 70 (Essex Yeomanry) Signal Squadron to form 68 (Inns of Court & City and Essex Yeomanry) Signal Squadron.

Under Strategic Defence and Security Review in 2014, 907 Signal Troop was subordinated to 36 Signal Squadron, which then became 36 (Essex Yeomanry) Signal Squadron. 68 Squadron reverted to the name of 68 (Inns of Court & City Yeomanry) Signal Squadron, with a footprint solely inside north London.

== Current structure ==
Today the organisation consists of the following entities:

- 68 (Inns of Court & City Yeomanry) Signal Squadron
- The Band of The Royal Yeomanry (Inns of Court & City Yeomanry)

The Signal Squadron operates out of two locations: its HQ is in a Georgian townhouse in Lincoln's Inn, Holborn and more austere post-war premises in Whipps Cross, Leytonstone some 17 kilometers away in east London. The Signal Squadron is a Close Support Squadron within 71 (Yeomanry) Signal Regiment, itself part of the Royal Corps of Signals within the British Army Reserve.

The Band is based in Hackney in east London. One of twenty Army Reserve bands, it is the only one in the Royal Armoured Corps.

== Regimental museum ==
The regimental museum, which contains a variety of records, photographs and other militaria relating to the IC&CY, ICR and COLY, is located at 10 Stone Buildings, Lincoln's Inn, London.

== Freedoms ==
The regiment has received the freedom of several locations throughout its history; these include:

- (England) 1998: Waltham Forest.
