= Stone Buildings =

Buildings in Lincoln's Inn, London, England

Coordinates: 51.5175°N 0.1141°W

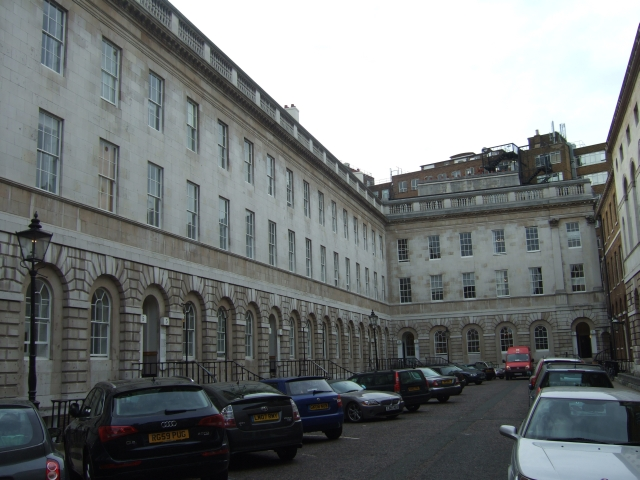
Stone Buildings, Lincoln's Inn

Stone Buildings, Lincoln's Inn were constructed from 1774 to 1780. The architect was Sir Robert Taylor. Stone Buildings is a Grade I listed building. Stone Buildings appear in Anthony Trollope's novel The Prime Minister.

Stone Buildings are so-called from the material with which they are constructed. They were constructed in accordance with an ultimately unrealised plan to rebuild Lincoln's Inn entirely in stone. Their construction was the initial step in that plan.

The working drawings were made by a young man called Leach, then a clerk in Taylor's office, who later became Master of the Rolls. Leach's drawings are preserved in the Library of Lincoln's Inn. Pitt's chambers appear to have been in Stone Buildings from December 1779. Canning's father was "for some time with a Serjeant Walker who then resided in Stone Buildings". The South end was added from 1844 to 1845 under the direction of Philip Hardwick.

Stone Buildings are situated parallel with the west side of Chancery Lane, and the western range of buildings faces the gardens of Lincoln's Inn and the square, with an oblong court between the two buildings. The Chancery Lane side is very plain, but the garden front consists of a rustic basement, with arcades and windows, at the north end of which is a wing consisting of six Corinthian pillars, which support an entablature and pediment. The cornice of the wing is continued through the whole length of the front, which terminates in a balustrade, but the two ranges of windows are entirely plain. The northern entrance is by handsome iron gates in Chancery Lane. The structure is not in keeping with the architecture of the other buildings; but, when viewed through the foliage of the garden, it has a very pleasing effect.

On 23 December 1790, by the violence of the wind at noon, the copper covering of the roof of the new buildings was blown off in one sheet, and hung over the front like a large carpet or mainsail. The noise occasioned by this accident made the neighbourhood conclude the building was falling down. Some of the plates composing this covering were torn off and carried into a yard in Holborn.

Sir Charles Wetherell had chambers in Stone Buildings. The Duke of Wellington took shelter there when he was attacked by a mob on 18 June 1832.

The Registers' and Accountant-General's Offices were at 8, 9 and 11 Stone Buildings.

The buildings are faced with Portland stone.

The buildings that comprise Stone Buildings are numbered from 1 to 11. 1 and 11 Stone Buildings are opposite separate sides of 76B Chancery Lane. 7 and 8 Stone Buildings are opposite 10 to 12 Old Square.

== 2 Stone Buildings ==
The Library of Lincoln's Inn was located on the ground floor of this building from 1755. Samuel Ireland said that the valuable and extensive library was housed in an elegant suite of apartments, consisting of four rooms, three of which commanded a pleasant view of the gardens. In this collection (which included upwards of 8,000 volumes) were many rare and valuable books, in the most perfect condition. The excellent order in which they were ranged, and the extreme neatness that prevailed throughout the apartments, reflected great honour on those who had the superintendence of them.

There were two portraits in the principal apartment; that over the chimney-piece, to the left of the entrance, was well painted, and represented Sir Richard Rainsford, lord chief justice in the reign of Charles I.; the other, which hung between the windows, was a portrait of Sir John Franklin, master in ordinary of the court of chancery, who, by the inscription, appears to have died in 1707. There were, besides, some fine Italian drawings, and copies in miniature, of the celebrated Venus, by Titian, and other Italian masters. The second chamber contained some very good pictures; among which, that of the Virgin and Child appeared, in point of design, to possess no small degree of merit. Between the windows was a very singular three-quarter portrait, representing a handsome woman loosely attired, holding in her hand a bleeding heart, pierced through with a dart; in the background were two small figures, representing Mars and Venus; applicable, no doubt, to the subject of the picture, which seemed very ancient, and was extremely dirty; unfortunately the name of the lady was not known. The drawings, in this apartment, were by the same Italian masters, as those he before noticed. In this room there were also two large globes, apparently of Elizabeth's time; they were so much defaced as to be perfectly useless by 1800. There was also a three-quarter portrait in the third chamber, of the famous judge Hales, who bequeathed to the honourable society all his valuable manuscripts; and, in the fourth apartment, hung a good picture of the late Lord Mansfield, chief justice of the King's Bench and five old pictures, on the subject of Christ at Emmaus. In an alcove, at the further end of this room, stood a beautiful marble bust of the great Cicero. There were also several pictures, of whose merit nothing could be ascertained, as they were totally obscured with dirt. The Library was removed from this building in 1845.

Arthur Cayley lived here. The United Law Clerks Society was here. Law firm Edwin Coe is the current occupant.

== 3 Stone Buildings ==
James Kenneth Stephen had chambers in this building. The basement of this building became the address of the Incorporated Council of Law Reporting on 16 May 1951, and their office was in this building.

It currently houses Three Stone, the Chambers of John McDonnell QC, which is a merger of two chancery-commercial chambers in Lincoln's Inn: Thirteen Old Square Chambers and 3 Stone Buildings.

== 4 Stone Buildings ==
Pitt the Younger had chambers here.

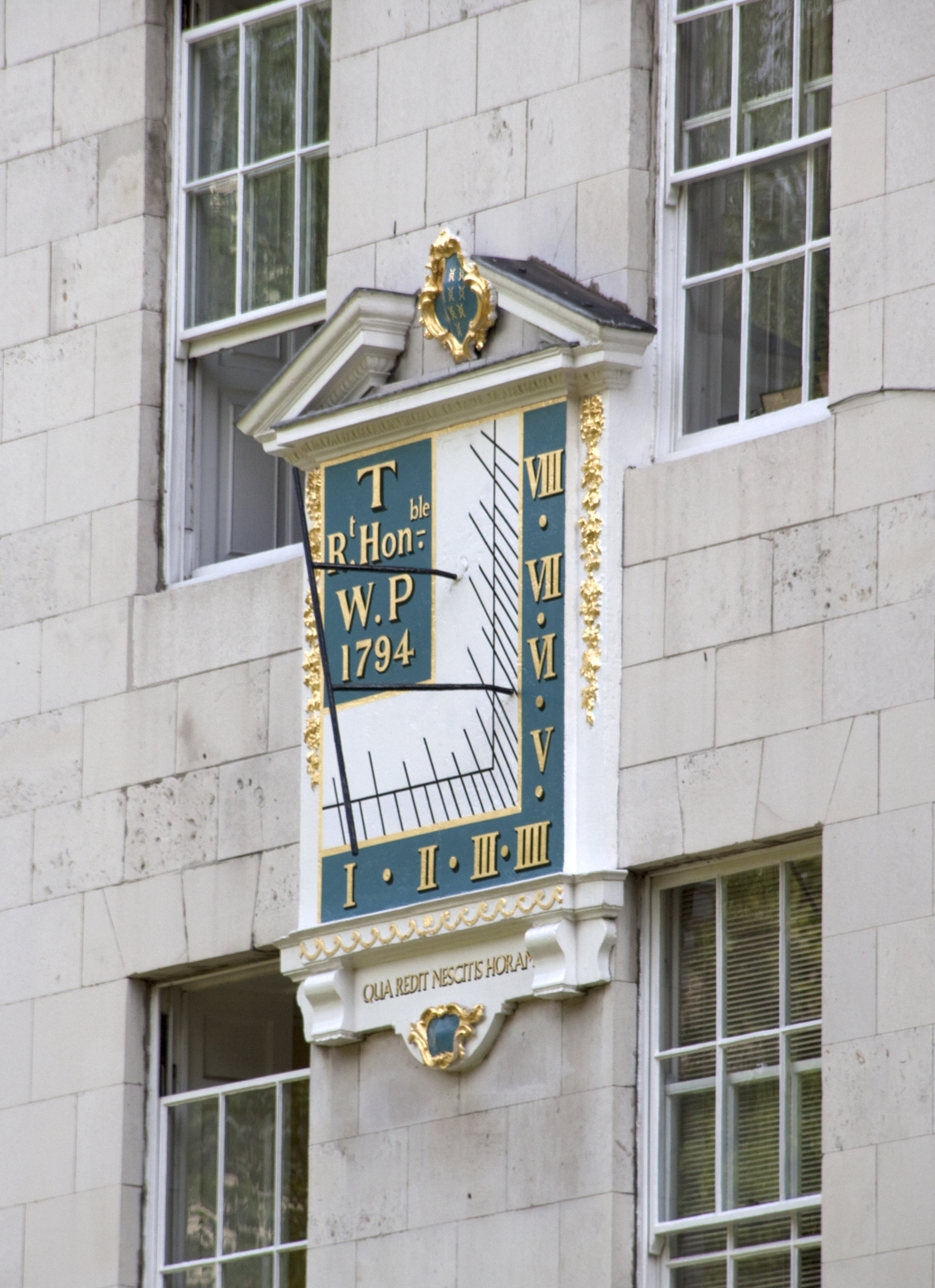
The sundial on the west front of 4 Stone Buildings.

There is on the west front of 4 Stone Buildings, facing the garden and just outside the chambers formerly occupied by Pitt, a sundial bearing the inscription "Qua Redit Nescitis Horam", which means "you know not the hour in which he returns". This sundial previously stood on an old gable in Old Buildings, Lincoln's Inn. It was put in its present place in 1794, during Pitt's Treasureship, at which time it was repainted and further inscribed "T. the Rt. hon.ble W.P." It was restored again in 1848. From the different situation of its plane, it only shows the hours from noon till night. During the Second World War, it only just avoided being destroyed by bombs which fell on Stone Buildings.

== 5 Stone Buildings ==
Sir Charles Wetherell MP resided here. The editorial office of The Law Times was here. In July 1918, the Bar Council acquired new offices at 5 Stone Buildings, of a character more suitable to the duties they were called upon to discharge. It had been found impossible to obtain equally suitable accommodation in the Temple; but it was hoped that the advantages of the new premises would counterbalance any inconvenience which might be felt by a section of the Bar in consequence of the removal from the Temple. The furniture and fittings of the new premises were presented to the Bar Council by their then chairman, Mr P. O. Lawrence KC. The thanks of the council to the donor were expressed and recorded in a resolution dated 11 November 1918.

5 Stone Buildings is a barristers' chambers. It currently comprises 42 members, of whom ten are King's Counsel, whose specialisations include private client, estate planning, tax, probate disputes, partnership, property litigation, professional negligence, pensions and other chancery related commercial matters. The chambers are ranked highly in the legal directory Chambers and Partners.

== 6 Stone Buildings ==
The Chancery Subpoena Office was here. From 1941, the office of the Incorporated Council of Law Reporting was here. Sir Thomas Manners Sutton, then Solicitor General, was here.

== 7 Stone Buildings ==
This is the part of Stone Buildings that was constructed in 1845. The Exchequer Office of Pleas and the Exchequer Rule Office were here. From 1845, the business of the Court of Exchequer was transacted in the offices which occupied two floors (namely, the ground floor and the basement floor) of this building. The accommodation on the ground floor consisted of a large hall 38 feet by 28 feet, used as a place of business for persons engaged in the taxing of costs and other matters, and as a general waiting-room for witnesses, etc. in attendance on references or other business. Within this space was also contained an office partitioned off for the two clerks in immediate attendance on the masters, and a box for the messengers. On the same floor there were five rooms for the masters varying in size from 23 feet by 10 feet, to 23 feet by 15 feet, together with another room which was used as a library and waiting-room. After the changes introduced by the two Common Law Procedure Acts, and especially in consequence of the frequent references of causes to the masters, the accommodation afforded in 1860 by the masters' rooms, and the space in immediate connexion with them, was often inadequate for the convenience of the counsel, attorneys, parties and witnesses in attendance. On the basement floor, an equal amount of space, but differently divided, was occupied by the writ, appearance, judgment, execution, and rule offices, and by the record room and housekeeper's apartments. The housekeeper had also a bedroom in the attics of the building. The total general area of each of the floors occupied by the offices of the Court was 3,130 square feet, making together a rough total of twice that extent, or 6,260 square feet. In 1880, certain rooms, up to that time used by the Masters of the Exchequer, became common rooms. From 1947, the Council of Legal Education was here.

== 8 Stone Buildings ==
John Walpole Willis had chambers here. In 2017 it housed a boutique law firm, Candey.

== 9 Stone Buildings ==
From 1893 until 2024, 9 Stone Buildings housed a chambers of the same name, specialising in commercial-chancery law. At the time of its dissolution, it was the oldest set of chambers in Lincoln's Inn.

== 10 Stone Buildings ==
10 Stone Buildings was the home of the Writ of Record Office until 1882 when the premises were acquired by the Inns of Court Regiment. The Inns of Court and City Yeomanry Museum is also located in the building.

== 11 Stone Buildings ==
11 Stone Buildings was a set of commercial / chancery barristers. They practiced commercial law with specialist groups for all types of contract, company, insolvency, banking & finance and real estate disputes. They acted as advocates, advisers, arbitrators and mediators for law firms, for in-house legal departments and for licensed and public access clients. They were also members of the ADR Group, the alternative dispute resolution network. The set consisted of 42 members including 4 Queen's Counsel, and had 16 employees. Head of Chambers was Edward Cohen, whilst the Chambers Director was Michael Couling.

The set was dissolved in October 2015 because the barristers felt their practices would be best served by moving to more specialised chambers.

11SB now houses part of Edwin Coe.

== References and sources ==
Sources

- Spilsbury, William Holden. Lincoln's Inn; Its Ancient and Modern Buildings: with an Account of the Library. W. Pickering. 1850. pp 36, 83-85.
- "A Prime Minister in Stone Buildings" (1945) 89 Solicitors Journal 422 Google Books.
- Alejandro Bahamón. "Stone Buildings" in London: Atlas of Architecture. Anova Books. Page 23.
- Ian Nairn. Nairn's London. Penguin Books. 1961. p 109. Google Books.
