= Harold Roper Robinson =

British physicist

- Born: 26 November 1889; Ulverston
- Died: 28 November 1955 (aged 66)
- Awards: FRS; Rutherford Medal and Prize (1942)
- Scientific career
- Institutions: Queen Mary University of London; University of London

Harold Roper Robinson FRS (26 November 1889 – 28 November 1955) was a physicist and, in later life, an outstanding figure in university administration.

== Early life ==
Robinson was born at 36 Ainslie Street in Ulverston, Lancashire on 26 November 1889, the eldest of four brothers and one sister to James Robinson, a managing clerk in a solicitor's office. Harold was educated at the Wesleyan School then the Victoria Secondary School in Ulverston.

In 1908 he went to the University of Manchester to study physics on a scholarship. He graduated with a BSc in 1911 and gained an MSC in 1912. His postgraduate studies, and duties as an Assistant Lecturer. were interrupted by the First World War during which he served as a 2nd Lt in the Royal Garrison Artillery in France from 1915. He later transferred to the Field Survey Battalion of the Royal Engineers (mapping) first as a Captain then as an Adjutant. During the war, he worked with Lawrence Bragg on soundranging.

After the war (1920) he gained a place as assistant director of the Physical Laboratory at Manchester. In 1923/24 he gained a place at the University of Cambridge as a postgraduate and gained a doctorate (PhD) in 1924. He then moved to the University of Edinburgh as a Reader in physics.

In 1925 he was elected a Fellow of the Royal Society of Edinburgh. His proposers were Sir James Alfred Ewing, Charles Barkla, Sir Charles Galton Darwin and Sir Edmund Taylor Whittaker.

== Career ==
In 1926 he was given his first professorship, at University College, Cardiff in Wales.

The citation on his election to Fellowship of the Royal Society in 1929 reads: "Before 1914 he carried out a series of researches into the nature of Beta-rays and other problems of radio activity. Distinguished also by his recent work on the energies of X-ray levels, as deduced from the velocities of secondary corpuscular rays, on which important branch of atomic physics he has obtained world-wide recognition as one of the pioneers."

"Professor Robinson came to Queen Mary College, University of London, from University College, Cardiff, as Head of the Physics Department. He is acknowledged as one of the greatest of Rutherford's collaborators. He devised and developed the techniques of X-ray photoelectric spectroscopy and X-ray emission spectroscopy which became valuable tools in chemical analysis. Arising from this work he also deduced the then most accurate values of ratios of atomic constants."

In 1942, he delivered the first Rutherford Memorial Lecture.

Robinson was appointed Vice-Principal of Queen Mary College in 1946.

Robinson decided to retire in 1953, but took the position of Vice-Chancellor of the University of London (1954–1955).

== Family ==
In 1920 he married the economics graduate Marjorie Eve Powell (1893–1939). Following her death in 1939 he married Madeleine Symons, a prominent trade union organiser, in 1940.

== Publications ==
- H. R. Robinson, "Rutherford: life and work to the year 1919, with personal reminiscences of the Manchester period", in Rutherford at Manchester (ed. J. B. Birks), pp. 53–86 (Heywood & Co., London, 1962)
- H. R. Robinson and L. Wright, "Evan Jenkin Evans", Proc. Phys. Soc. 56, PP. 404–406 (1944).
