= New Inn (Temple) =

The New Inn was one of the Inns of Chancery or Hospida Cancellarie. It existed from the late 15th century until 1902 and was located near Aldwych in London.

== Origins ==
It was founded in 1485 out of what had been previously a common tavern called the Inn of Our lady, by students of the former St. George's Inn, near the Old Bailey which had fallen into disrepair. By the year 1608, its freehold had been acquired by the Middle Temple.

== Purpose ==
These were a group of buildings and legal institutions in London initially attached to the Inns of Court and used as offices for the clerks of chancery, from which they drew their name. Existing from at least 1344, the Inns gradually changed their purpose, and became both the offices and accommodation for solicitors (as the Inns of Court were to barristers) and a place of initial training for barristers.

== Inns ==
The judge John Fortescue wrote of ten Inns of Chancery, each one attached to an Inn of Court "like Maids of Honour to a Princess". Only nine are known of in detail; the other was St George's Inn.

The ten Inns were:

- Clement's Inn, Lyon's Inn and Clifford's Inn attached to the Inner Temple,
- St George's Inn, Strand Inn, and New Inn attached to the Middle Temple,
- Furnival's Inn and Thavie's Inn attached to Lincoln's Inn, and
- Staple Inn and Barnard's Inn attached to Gray's Inn.

== Middle Temple attachments ==
The first lawyers to occupy the premises which later became the Middle Temple came from St George's Inn, arriving by 1346. The inn was later deserted in favour of New Inn. Strand Inn, also called Chester Inn, was the shortest lived of the Inns of Chancery. Founded in the fifteenth century it was pulled down in the 1540s by [Edward Seymour, 1st Duke of Somerset] in his role as Lord Protector so that he could build Somerset House. The students instead went to New Inn, and Strand Inn was absorbed into that Inn. Thomas Occleve was said to have studied at Strand Inn. After the destruction of Strand Inn, New Inn was the only Inn of Chancery left attached to the Middle Temple.

Noted students included Sir Thomas More, who attended New Inn before going to Lincoln's Inn.

The Inn was acquired by the London County Council in 1899 for its Kingsway improvement scheme. The buildings of New Inn were pulled down in 1902 to make way for Aldwych (and Kingsway) to connect Holborn and the Strand. Australia House occupies part of the site of New Inn.
