= Inns of Court =

Professional associations for barristers in England and Wales

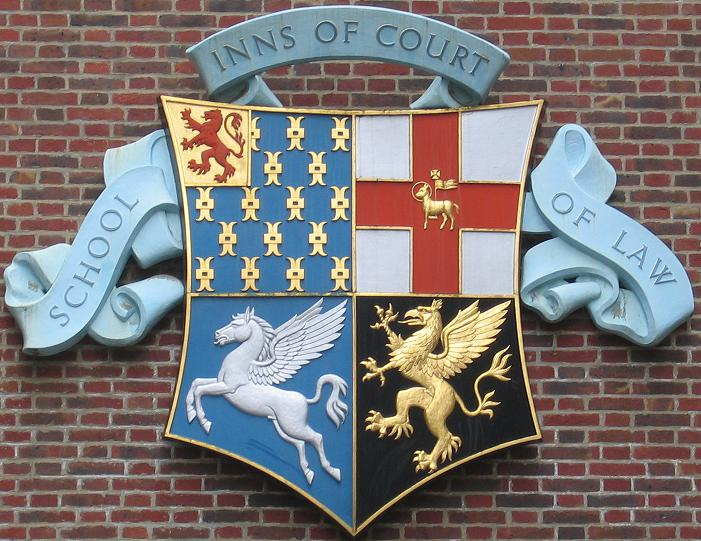
Combined arms of the four Inns of Court. Clockwise from top left: Lincoln's Inn, Middle Temple, Gray's Inn, Inner Temple.

The Inns of Court in London are the professional associations for barristers in England and Wales. There are four Inns of Court: Gray's Inn, Lincoln's Inn, Inner Temple, and Middle Temple.

All barristers must belong to one of them. They have supervisory and disciplinary functions over their members, and provide libraries, dining facilities and professional accommodation. Each also has a church or chapel attached to it, and is a self-contained precinct where barristers traditionally train and practise. However, growth in the legal profession, together with a desire to practise from more modern and lower-rent accommodation, caused many barristers' chambers to move outside the precincts of the Inns of Court in the late 20th century.

== History ==
During the 12th and early 13th centuries, law was taught in the City of London, primarily by the clergy. In 1219 Pope Honorius III promulgated Super Specula, prohibiting the clergy from studying secular law as opposed to canon law. As a result, English common law began to be practised and taught by laymen instead of clerics. To protect their schools from competition, first Henry II (r. 1154–1189) and later Henry III (r. 1216–1272) issued proclamations prohibiting the teaching of civil law within the City of London. The common-law lawyers worked in guilds of law, modelled on trade guilds, which in time became the Inns of Court.

In the earliest centuries of their existence, beginning with the 14th century, the Inns were any of a sizeable number of buildings or precincts where lawyers traditionally lodged, trained and carried on their profession. Over the centuries, the four Inns of Court became where barristers were trained, while the more numerous Inns of Chancery – which were initially affiliated to the Inns of Court – became associated with the training of solicitors in the Elizabethan era.

The four Inns of Court are:

- The Honourable Society of Lincoln's Inn
- The Honourable Society of the Inner Temple
- The Honourable Society of the Middle Temple
- The Honourable Society of Gray's Inn

Lawyers have lived and worked in the Temple since 1320. In 1337 the premises were divided into the Inner Temple, where the lawyers resided, and Middle Temple, which was also occupied by lawyers by 1346. Lincoln's Inn, the largest, is able to trace its official records to 1422. The records of Gray's Inn begin in 1569, but teaching is thought to have begun there in the late-fourteenth century. In 1620 a meeting of senior judges decided that all four Inns would be equal in order of precedence.

Until the 16th century students or apprentices learned their craft primarily by attending court sessions and by sharing both accommodation and education during the legal terms. Prior to the outbreak of the English Civil War in 1642, this training lasted at least seven years; subsequently, the Inns focused their residency requirements on dining together in the company of experienced barristers, to enable learning through contact and networking with experts. In the mid-18th century the common law was first recognised as a subject for study in the universities, and by 1872 bar examinations became compulsory for entry into the profession of law.

=== Importance in English Renaissance theatre ===
The Inns played an important role in the history of the English Renaissance theatre. Notable literary figures and playwrights who resided in the Inns of Court included John Donne (1572-1631), Francis Beaumont (1584-1616), John Marston (1576-1634), Thomas Lodge (c. 1558-1625), Thomas Campion (1567-1620), Abraham Fraunce (c. 1559-c. 1593), Sir Philip Sidney (1554-1586), Sir Thomas More (1478-1535), Sir Francis Bacon (1561-1626), and George Gascoigne (c. 1535-1577). Plays written and performed in the Inns of Court include Gorboduc, Gismund of Salerne (1561), and The Misfortunes of Arthur (1588). An example of a famous masque put on by the Inns was James Shirley's The Triumph of Peace (1634). Shakespeare's The Comedy of Errors (c. 1594) and Twelfth Night (c. 1602) were also performed at the Inns, although written for commercial theatre.

=== Military tradition ===
Since at least 1584, members of the Inns of Court have taken arms to defend the realm during times of crisis. That tradition continues to the present, in that 10 Stone Buildings in Lincoln's Inn has been the permanent home of the Inns of Court & City Yeomanry since the building was freed up by the abolition of the Clerks of Chancery in 1842.

== Membership and governance ==
Each of the four Inns of Court has three ordinary grades of membership: students, barristers, and more senior masters of the bench or "benchers", who constitute the governing body for each Inn and appoint new members from among existing barrister members. According to the rules any barrister member of the inn is eligible for appointment; in practice, appointments are made of senior members of the Bar, usually KCs, or High Court judges or those who carry out work on behalf of the Inn on committees or through the training of students and other junior members.

The senior bencher of each Inn is the Treasurer, a position which is held for one year only. Each Inn usually also has at least one royal bencher. Inns may also appoint honorary benchers, from academics, the world of politics and overseas judiciary.

The Inns of Court no longer provide all the education and training needed by prospective barristers, who must now pass the Bar Course, but do provide supplementary education during the 'Bar School' year, pupillage and the early years of practice. All prospective Bar School students must be members of one of the four Inns, and must attend ten (formerly twelve) (Note: The change takes effect for students being called to the bar on or after 1 July 2021.) 'qualifying sessions' before being eligible to qualify as a barrister. Qualifying sessions traditionally comprise formal dinners followed by law-related talks, but increasingly the inns offer training weekends that may count for several sessions' worth of attendance. The Inns still retain the sole right to call qualified students to the bar, (Note: The U.S. equivalent would be graduation from law school, service of a one-year internship, and admission to the bar of a state's court of last resort.) which is associated with a graduation ceremony ('Call Day').

Prospective students may choose which Inn to apply to for membership, but can only apply to one Inn for scholarships. It makes no long-term difference which Inn a barrister joins; an applicant might, for example, choose a particular inn because they know someone already a member, or it has a student association at their university.

The inns' disciplinary functions are carried out by a joint Council of the Inns of Court, which administers the disciplinary tribunals. When necessary barristers are prosecuted by the Bar Standards Board.

== Location and layout ==
The four inns are located near one another in central London, near the western boundary of the City of London. Nearby are the Royal Courts of Justice, which were moved for convenience from Westminster Hall to the legal quarter of London in 1882.

Middle Temple and Inner Temple are "liberties" of the City of London; although within the boundaries of the City they are not subject to its jurisdiction, and operate as their own local authorities. These two Inns neighbour each other and occupy the core of the Temple area. The closest Tube station is Temple.

Gray's Inn and Lincoln's Inn are in the London Borough of Camden (formerly in the Borough of Holborn) near the boundary with the City of London. They do not have the status of a local authority. The nearest Tube station is Chancery Lane.

Each Inn is a substantial complex with a great hall, chapel, libraries, sets of chambers for many hundreds of barristers, and gardens, and covers several acres. The layout is similar to that of an Oxbridge college. The chambers were originally used as residences as well as business premises by many of the barristers, but today they serve as offices with only a small number of residential apartments.

== Historically related Inns ==
=== Serjeants' Inn ===
Another important inn, Serjeants' Inn, was dissolved in 1877 and its assets were, controversially, distributed amongst the existing members. The membership of the Inn had consisted of a small class of senior barristers called serjeants-at-law, who were selected from the members of the other four inns and had exclusive rights of audience in certain courts. Their pre-eminence was affected by the new rank of King's (or Queen's) Counsel, which was granted to barristers who were not serjeants. The serjeant's privileges were withdrawn by the government in the 19th century, no more serjeants were appointed, and they eventually died out. The area now known as Serjeants' Inn, one of two sites formerly occupied by the Serjeants (the other being in Chancery Lane), was purchased by the Inner Temple in 2002.

It was formerly the custom for senior judges to join Serjeants' Inn, thereby leaving the Inn in which they had practised as barristers. This meant that the Masters of the Bench of the four barristers' Inns of Court were mostly themselves barristers. Since there is now no Serjeants' Inn, judges remain in the Inns which they joined as students and belonged to as barristers. This has had the effect of making the majority of the Masters of the Bench senior judges, appointed either before or after becoming benchers.

=== Inns of Chancery ===
There were also several Inns of Chancery. These are not Inns of Court but are associated to them: Clement's Inn, Clifford's Inn and Lyon's Inn (attached to the Inner Temple); Strand Inn and New Inn (attached to the Middle Temple); Furnival's Inn and Thavie's Inn (attached to Lincoln's Inn); and Staple Inn and Barnard's Inn (attached to Gray's Inn).

=== Irish Inns of Court ===
In the Republic of Ireland, there is only one Inn of Court, the Honorable Society of King's Inns, founded in Dublin in 1541. A separate Northern Ireland Inn of Court was founded in Belfast in 1926 after the partition of Ireland.

== American Inns of Court ==
From the late 1970s, U.S. Chief Justice Warren Burger led a movement to create Inns of Court in the United States, loosely modelled after the traditional English Inns. In 1985, he and others established the American Inns of Court Foundation to promote and formally charter local Inns of Court across the United States. Each local Inn is devoted to promoting professionalism, civility, ethics, and legal skills amongst the American bench and bar, in a collegial setting, through continuing education and mentoring. Major American cities have more than one Inn of Court; for example, one Inn may be affiliated with a local law school, and another may be associated with a specific field of legal practice. American Inns of Court do not possess any real property. They are groups of judges, practising attorneys, law professors and students who meet regularly, usually monthly, to discuss and debate issues relating to legal ethics and professionalism. American Inn of Court meetings typically consist of a shared meal and a programme presented by one of the Inn's pupillage teams.

The U.S. does not require attorneys—not divided into barristers and solicitors—to be members of an Inn of Court, and many of the equivalent functions are performed by state bar associations. Some states require attorneys to belong to the official bar association, e.g., the State Bar of Michigan, while other states, such as Illinois, do not make membership of an official bar association a compulsory condition of licensure. Neither voluntary professional associations (including the American Inns of Court) nor mandatory bar associations typically have any role in training or licensing of law students that would be comparable to that function of the four English Inns of Court in selection and training of new barristers.

While the American Inns of Court share a collegial relationship with the English Inns, there is no formal or legal relationship. A Declaration of Friendship was signed by the English and American Inns of Court, establishing visitation procedures under which American Inn members can acquire a letter of introduction that will officially introduce them to the Inns in England and Ireland, with reciprocal procedures available for English and Irish barristers. An annual six-week exchange program, known as the Pegasus Scholarships, was created to provide for young English barristers to travel to the United States, and young American Inn of Court members to travel to London, to learn about the legal system of the other jurisdiction.

== See also ==
- King's Inns, the direct equivalent in the Irish system.
- Faculty of Advocates, the rough equivalent in Scotland to the English Inns of Court
- Doctors' Commons
- The Inns of Court & City Yeomanry
- City Law School, formerly the Inns of Court School of Law
