= Holborn Bars =

Building in the London Borough of Camden, England

Coordinates: 51°31′6″N 0°6′36″W

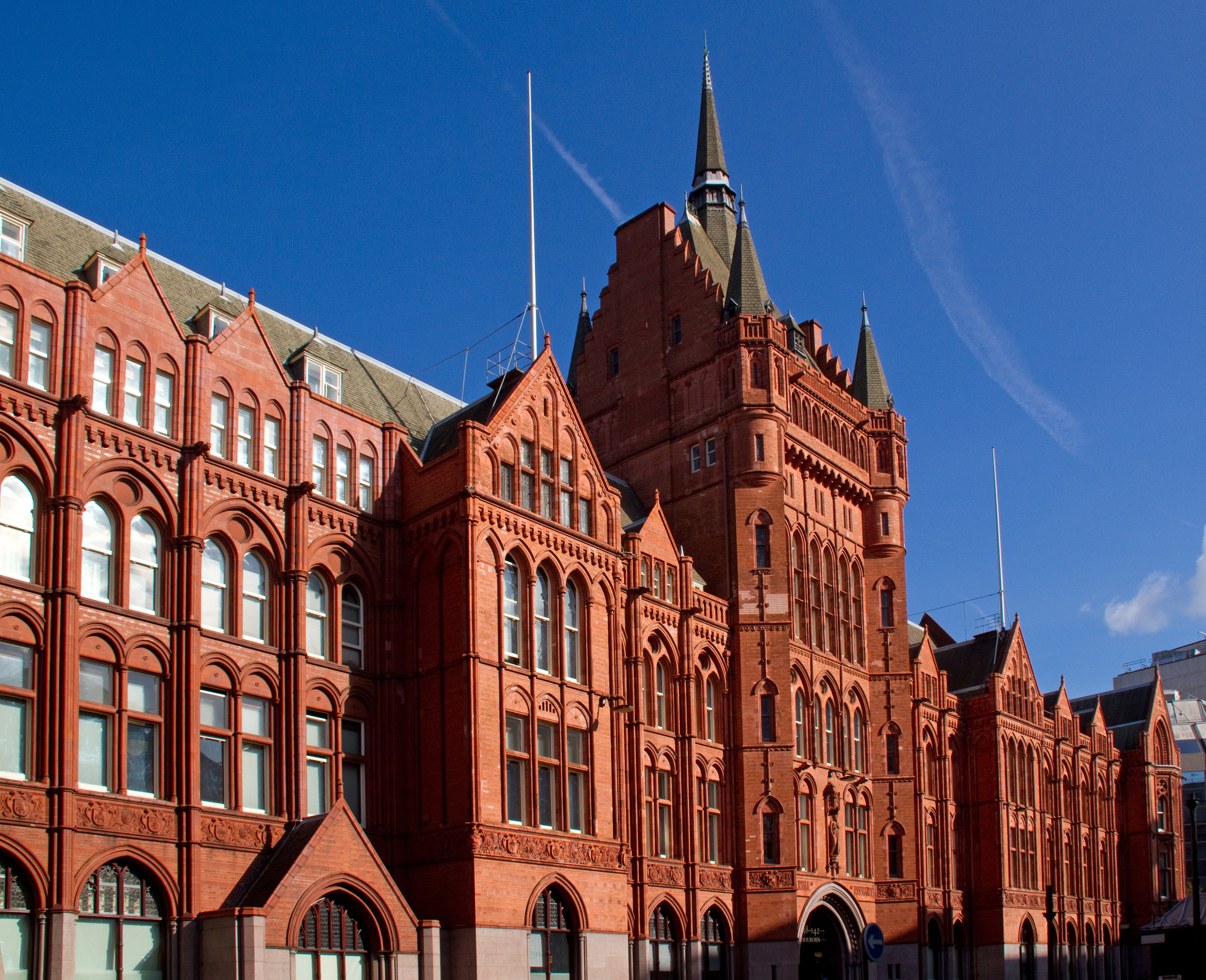
Prudential Assurance Building, 142 Holborn, Camden

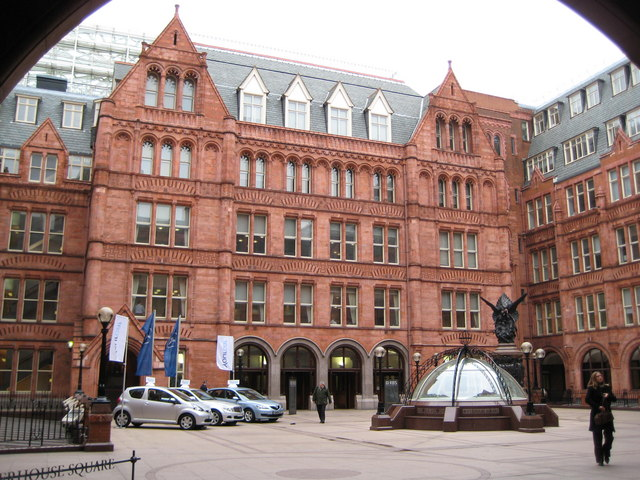
Waterhouse Square, the internal courtyard at the rear of the building, showing its domed skylight feature

Holborn Bars, also known as the Prudential Assurance Building, is a large red terracotta Victorian building on the north side (138–142) of Holborn in Camden at the boundary of the City of London, England. The block is bounded by Holborn to the south, Brooke Street to the west, Leather Lane to the east and Beauchamp Street to the north.

== History ==
Located close to the Holborn Bar city boundary of the City of London Holborn Bars was built on the site of the former Furnival's Inn building of the Inns of Chancery. It was designed in Gothic Revival style for the Prudential Assurance Society by architects initially Alfred Waterhouse and his son Paul Waterhouse who became a partner in his father's firm from 1891, and built by Holland, Hannen & Cubitts in phases between 1876 and 1901. The interior design of the main entrance hall was completed in 1906.

The building was modified between 1930 and 1932 by E. M. Joseph, who introduced Art Deco features, and expanded again in 1993 by EPR Architects to a floor area of 34,931 square metres. Prudential moved out of the building in 1999 but retained ownership of it.

== Description ==
The building originally featured a library, restaurant, chapel, hall, rooftop promenade and a women's entrance. It was electrically lit and featured hot running water. The complex now encloses a courtyard, Waterhouse Square, named after the original architect. The building was listed Grade II* on 3 March 1972.

== Tenants ==
Current tenants include:

- WeWork
- MyEdSpace
- Glyphic AI Limited
- Composo AI
- Consulting firm Curve Analytics
- De Vere (hotel operator)

Former tenants have included:

- English Heritage had its London office at 1 Waterhouse Square from 2006 to 2017
- Alston Rivers
- Inter-public Group (Weber Shandwick, Golin)
