= Drout =

Drout is a surname. Notable people with the surname include:

- Michael D. C. Drout (born 1968), American academic and author
- John Drout (fl. 1570), English poet
