= Wych Street =

Former street in Westminster, England

Coordinates: 51°30′47″N 0°6′59″W

Wych Street, The Illustrated London News, January 1870.

Wych Street was in Westminster where King, Melbourne and Australia Houses now stand on Aldwych. It ran west from the church of St Clement Danes on the Strand to meet the southern end of Drury Lane. It was demolished by the London County Council in around 1901, as part of redevelopment bisected by new street Aldwych, the east of which mimics its course, in a curved way so taking up land buildings stood on, and these works created Kingsway.

== History ==
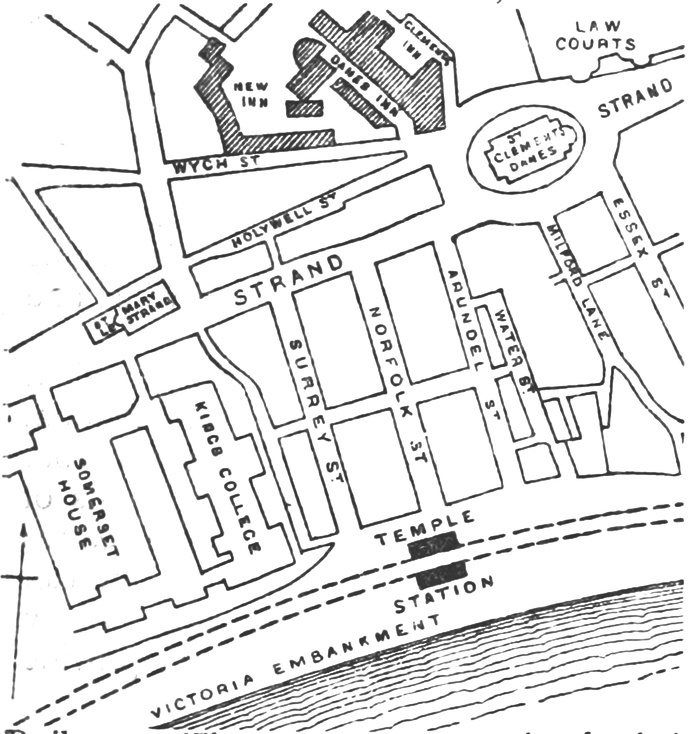
Wych Street, on a plan of 1888

The area around Drury Lane was not affected by the Great Fire of London, and contained decrepit Elizabethan houses, with projecting wooden jetties. The Angel Inn public house was at the bottom of the street, by the Strand. Further west, about halfway along on the north side, was the New Inn, an Inn of Chancery where Sir Thomas More received his early legal education, and, to the south, Lyon's Inn, another Inn of Chancery where Sir Edward Coke was a reader in 1578, which was replaced by a Globe Theatre and the Opera Comique c. 1863. The Shakespeare's Head was the meeting place of the Club of Owls, named because of the late hours kept by its members. Mark Lemon, editor of Punch, lived there for a year and "a club of literati used to meet on the first floor".

In Literary Anecdotes John Nichols listed members of the monthly dining club that met at the Shakespeare's Head tavern: James Robson, Alderman Cadell, James Dodsley, Lockyer Davis, Thomas Longman, Peter Elmsly, honest Tom Payne of the Mews-gate, Thomas Evans of the Strand and Thomas Davies.

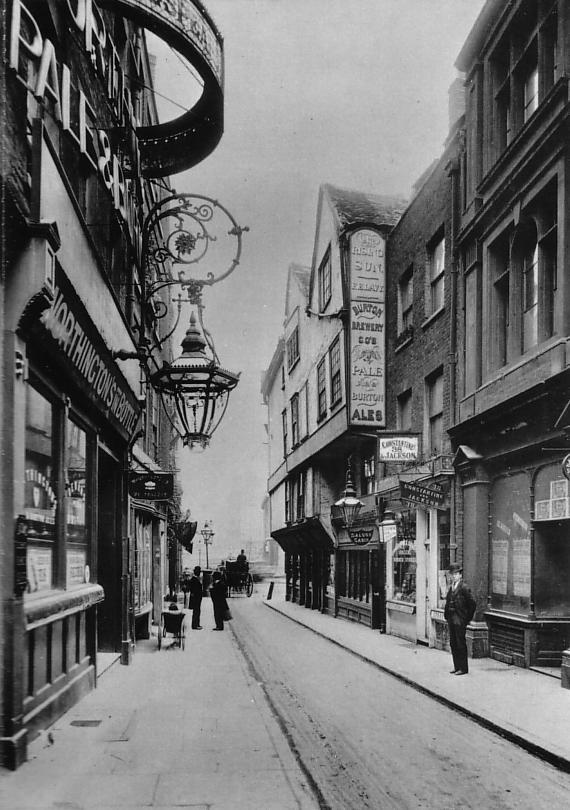
A 1901 postcard of Wych Street, shortly before its demolition

South of the western end was Drury House, the house of Sir Robert Drury, from which Drury Lane took its name, later rebuilt as Craven House by the first Lord Craven (died 1697), and finally turned into a public house, the "Queen of Bohemia", named after his unrequited love, Elizabeth of Bohemia, the daughter of James I. This building was demolished – replaced by the first Olympic Theatre. The artist Louise Rayner 1832-1924 painted the corner of Wych Street showing Symond's Coffee House circa 1880. Jack Sheppard, the infamous thief, was apprenticed to a carpenter, Mr. Wood, on this street; one of his haunts, the White Lion tavern, was here. The music hall performer Arthur Lloyd lived at № 39 in 1892.

Around 1780, the brothers George and John Jacob Astor, who became America's first multimillionaire, ran an instrument store in № 26.

== Cultural significance ==
Where Was Wych Street? is a short story by Stacy Aumonier (1877–1928).

== See also ==
- List of demolished buildings and structures in London
