= Old Holborn =

Hand rolled tobacco brand

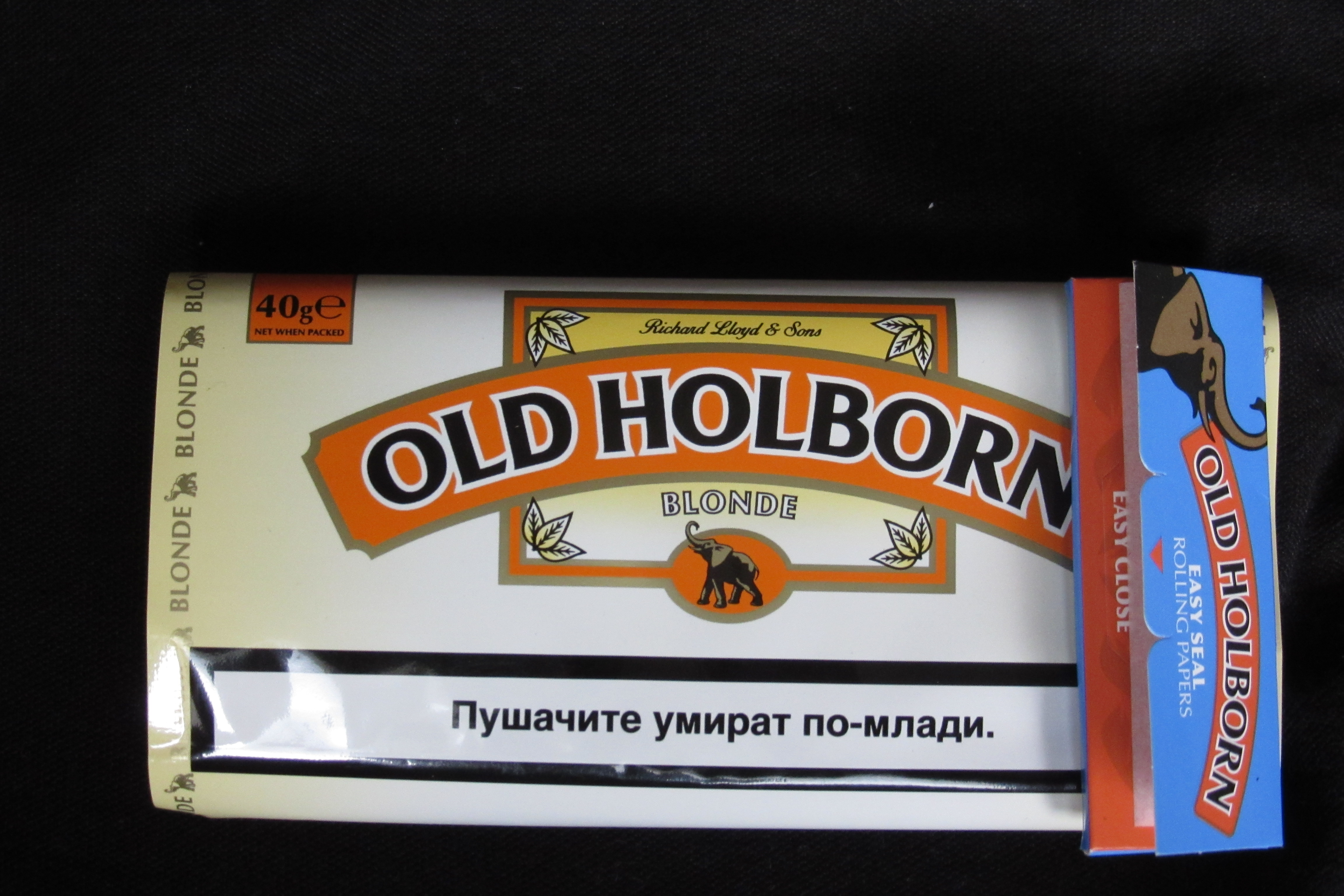
Old Holborn tobacco and rolling papers

Old Holborn (pronounced Ho'burn) is a brand of hand-rolled tobacco produced by Richard Lloyd & Sons (a subsidiary of Gallaher Group, which is a subsidiary of Japan Tobacco). The name originates from Holborn in London, where Richard Lloyd began combining different tobaccos in 1785. The former trademark was a depiction of Staple Inn in Holborn. The tobacco is made in the European Union.

== Varieties ==
Old Holborn is available in four varieties: dark Virginia tobacco in blue packaging, a lighter, smoother version in yellow packaging, an even lighter variety in white packaging, and aromatic tobacco in orange packaging. All four are available in pouches of 30g and 50g; Old Holborn is also sold in a box of ten 50g pouches and 100g drums.

In Germany, the pouches holding the dark tobacco (blue packaging) volume were reduced from 50g to 40g, and later to 35g. In the UK it is only available in 30g or 50g pouches.

== Popularity ==
Old Holborn Blue is the most popular "dark tobacco" in England. In Greece, Old Holborn Yellow is the best-selling tobacco. At the beginning of the 21st century, the popularity of Old Holborn in other European markets grew significantly. The blonde has been on the market since 2011.
