= List of demolished buildings and structures in London =

This list of demolished buildings and structures in London includes buildings, structures, and urban scenes of particular architectural and historical interest, scenic buildings which are preserved in old photographs, prints, and paintings, but which have been demolished or were destroyed by bombing in World War II. Only a small number of the most notable buildings are listed out of the many thousands that have been demolished.

== Buildings ==
Name	Date of construction	Date of destruction	Image	Location	Notes
148 Piccadilly	1862	1972		Piccadilly	Home of Lionel de Rothschild, designed by Thomas Nelson and Charles Innes. Located next to Apsley House. Demolished around 1972 to extend Park Lane to Piccadilly.
23 Great Winchester Street	17th century	c. 1882		City of London	Wealthy merchant's mansion with elaborate staircase and panelled rooms.
Adelphi Terrace	1768–1772	1930s		Adelphi	A neo-classical terrace of 24 houses by the Adam brothers.
Army and Navy Club	1848–1850	1950s		St James Square	Replaced by a 1950s building on the same site.
Astoria Theatre	1927	2009		Charing Cross Road	Designed by Edward A. Stone
Austin Friars	1260s	1600–1941		City of London	Friary, residence of Thomas Cromwell. Draper's Hall and the Dutch Church remain in reconstructed form.
Avon House	1920	?		Euston Road	For the Avon India Rubber Company. Designed by Robert Angell.
Baltic Exchange	1903	1992		St Mary Axe	Grade II* listed building known for its cathedral-like trading hall and its stained glass windows; destroyed by a bomb in 1992. Site now occupied by The Gherkin.
Bank of England	1790–1827	1920s–1930s		City of London	Additions by John Soane built from the 1790s to the 1820s were mostly demolished to make way for Herbert Baker's reconstruction in the 1920s.
Barclays Bank (Fleet Street branch)	1924	2022		Fleet Street	Designed by C. J. Dawson, Son & Allardyce. Demolished in 2022 with its neighbour Chronicle House.
Barnard's Inn	17th century	After 1879		Fetter Lane	Former Inn of Chancery. Hall still survives, owned by Gresham College.
Baynard's Castle	11th century	1666		Blackfriars	Destroyed during the Great Fire of London.
Beaver House	1926	1980s?		City of London	Built as a warehouse for the Hudson's Bay Company, and in 1940 became the company's headquarters.
Bethlem Hospital	1812–1814	c. 1931		Southwark	Built to a design by James Lewis. Largely demolished after the hospital moved in 1930. The central part of building survives and has housed the Imperial War Museum since 1936.
Birkbeck Bank	1905	1965		High Holborn	Designed by Thomas Knightley. Demolished in 1965.
Blake's House	18th century	1965		Soho	Birthplace of William Blake at No. 28 Broad (now Broadwick) Street; demolished to make way for a block of flats.
Bovril	1904	1970s		City of London	Located at 148-166 Old Street. Designed by H. V. Lanchester and E. A. Rickards. Demolished around 1970.
Worshipful Company of Brewers' Hall	1670–1673.1	1940		City of London	In Aldermanbury Square. Rebuilt after the Great Fire; destroyed by bombs.
Bridewell Palace	16th–17th century	1863–1864		Blackfriars	Residence of Henry VIII from 1515 to 1523; prison and hospital from 1556. Largely rebuilt after the Great Fire of London. Closed 1855.
Café Monico	1889	1959		Shaftesbury Avenue	Designed by John Thomas Christopher and Eley Emlyn White.
Carlton Club	1854–1856	1940		Pall Mall	By Sidney Smirke; suffered direct hit by bomb in 1940.
Carlton Hotel	1899	1940–1958		Haymarket	Prestigious hotel run by César Ritz, with Auguste Escoffier as chef. Badly damaged by bombs in 1940; demolished 1957–1958.
Carlton House	1709	1826		Pall Mall	Palace of George IV during the regency era.
Carlton Tavern	1921 (rebuilt 2019)	2015		Kilburn	Grade II listed building that was demolished without permission by a property developer, prompting the council to demand its rebuilding.
Carpenters' Hall	15th–18th century	1876		City of London	On London Wall. First hall dates from 1429; demolished 1876 after being damaged by fire. Second hall destroyed by bombs in 1941.
Chesterfield House	1747–1752	1937		Mayfair	Built for Philip Stanhope, 4th Earl of Chesterfield (1694–1773) by Isaac Ware.
Christ's Hospital	17th–19th century	1902		Newgate Street	School founded 1552; buildings mostly rebuilt after the Great Fire, in part by Wren and Hawksmoor. Relocated to Horsham in 1902.
Christ Church Greyfriars	1687	1940		Newgate Street	Rebuilt by Wren after the Great Fire. Largely destroyed by bombing in 1940; the tower and ruins remain.
Chronicle House	1924	2022		Fleet Street	Home of the Daily Chronicle. Designed by Herbert O. Ellis & Clarke.
City of London Lying-in Hospital	1770–1773	1940–1941		Old Street	Formerly housed in Shaftesbury House; moved to new building by Robert Mylne in 1773. Damaged by tube construction and partly rebuilt. Destroyed by bombs in 1940 and 1941.
Clifford's Inn	18th century	1934		Fleet Street	The longest surviving Inn of Chancery, founded in 1344; dissolved in 1903. Only the gatehouse remains.
Cloth Fair	17th century	1917		Smithfield	An area of old houses and narrow lanes adjoining the church of St Bartholomew-the-Great, including the Old Dick Whittington Inn. One 17th-century house survives.
Coal Exchange	1847–1849	1962		Lower Thames Street	One of the earliest examples of cast-iron construction, demolished for road-widening, which did not take place until the 1980s.
Columbia Market	1864–1869	1960		Bethnal Green	Designed by Henry Darbishire, ceased functioning as a market in 1889.
Commercial Cable Company	1922	1970s?		Wormwood Street	Designed by Edward Maufe. Demolished probably in the 1970s.
Commercial Union	1895	1927		Cornhill	Designed by John Macvicar Anderson. Collapsed during the construction of Lloyds Bank headquarters next door. Replaced by the current structure.
Constitutional Club	1886	1959		Northumberland Street	Designed by Robert William Edis.
Corn Exchange	1828	1882		Mark Lane	The building was designed by George Smith in the Greek Revival style.
Coutts Bank	1902	1970s		Strand	At 440 The Strand. Designed by John Macvicar Anderson. Demolished around 1970 when the whole block was redeveloped.
Covent Garden Theatre	1808	1856		Covent Garden	Second theatre on the site. Designed by Sir Robert Smirke. Burned down in 1856 and replaced by current Royal Opera House.
Crosby Hall	15th–17th centuries	1909–1910		Bishopsgate	Great hall re-erected in Chelsea and incorporated into a new building by Walter Godfrey. Many other buildings in Bishopsgate which escaped the Great Fire survived into the Victorian period.
Crystal Palace	1851	1936		Hyde Park	Built by Joseph Paxton for the Great Exhibition of 1851. Rebuilt in a different form in South London, 1854; destroyed by fire.
Cumberland House	1763	1908–1912		Pall Mall	By Matthew Brettingham; occupied by the Board of Ordnance, later the War Office, from 1806. Demolished to make way for the new Royal Automobile Club.
Devonshire House	c. 1740	1924		Piccadilly	Built by William Kent for the Dukes of Devonshire.
Doctors' Commons	c. 1670	1867		City of London	College of Advocates, or Doctors of Law, where proceedings of the Court of Arches, the Prerogative Court, and others were held. In Knightrider Street. Buildings arranged round two quadrangles; rebuilt after the Great Fire, sold in 1865, and subsequently demolished.
Dorchester House	1853	1929		Park Lane	Palatial house built by Lewis Vulliamy for Robert Stayner Holford; replaced by The Dorchester.
Drury Lane	17th century	1890		Drury Lane	Old houses which survived the Great Fire of London, including the former Cock and Magpie tavern (with sign), which had become Stockley's Bookshop by 1876.
Earls Court Exhibition Centre	1935	2014		Kensingston	
East India House	1729	1861		Leadenhall Street	Designed by amateur architect Theodore Jacobsen. Much of British India was governed from here until the British government took control in 1858.
Egyptian Hall	1812	1905		Piccadilly	Designed in the form of an ancient Egyptian temple for William Bullock, who used the building as an exhibition centre.
Electra House	1929	1999		Victoria Embankment	Built for the Eastern and Associated Telegraph Companies.
Euston Arch	1837	1961–1962		Euston	Original entrance to Euston Station; demolition was approved by Ernest Marples, who believed that the cost of moving the arch could not be justified.
Euston Theatre	1900	1970s		Euston	At Euston Road and Tonbridge Street. Designed by Wylson & Long. Renamed the Regent Theatre in 1920.
Exeter Hall	1831	1907		Strand	
Fleet Prison	1781–1782	1846		Farringdon Street	Built 1197; rebuilt after the Great Fire and again after the Gordon Riots in 1780. Closed 1842.
Foundling Hospital	1742–1752	1926		Bloomsbury	Designed by amateur architect Theodore Jacobsen. Founded by Thomas Coram, the hospital relocated to Redhill in the 1920s, and later Berkhamsted.
Fowler's Mill	1788	1825		Battersea	Horizontal windmill, milling continued by steam until 1892.
Furnival's Inn	1818	1897		Holborn	Former Inn of Chancery, rebuilt after the Inn was dissolved in 1817; home of Charles Dickens from 1834 to 1837.
General Post Office (GPO East)	1829	1912		St Martins-le-Grand	By Sir Robert Smirke.
General Post Office (GPO West)	1874	1967		St Martins-le-Grand	Designed by James Williams.
Globe Theatre	1868	1902			
Great Synagogue of London	1788–1789	1942		Aldgate	By James Spiller; centre of Jewish life in London, destroyed in The Blitz.
Great Wheel	1894–1895	1907		Earls Court	Constructed by Maudslay, Son & Field. Built for the Empire of India Exhibition at Earls Court in 1895. It had carried 2.5 million passengers at its time of closure in 1906.
Grosvenor House	1732–1843	1927		Park Lane	Originally Gloucester House, purchased in 1805 by Robert Grosvenor and subsequently enlarged. Replaced by the Grosvenor House Hotel.
Guards Club	1848	1922		Pall Mall	Designed by Henry Harrison. Vacated by the club in 1920, demolished in 1922 by the London City and Midland Bank.
Haberdashers' Hall	1671	1940		City of London	In Maiden Lane. The original hall was destroyed in the Great Fire and rebuilt by Edward Jerman. Destroyed by bombs.
Holford House	1832	1944–1948		Regent's Park	Home of Regent's Park College from 1855 to 1927. Suffered bomb damage in 1944; demolished 1948.
Holland House	1605	1940		Holland Park	Largely destroyed by bombs in September 1940; some remains still stand and house a youth hostel.
Imperial Hotel, London	1911	1967		Russell Square	Designed by Charles Fitzroy Doll.
Imperial Institute	1893	1957–1958		South Kensington	Designed by Thomas Edward Collcutt. Demolished from 1957 to make way for Imperial College; the Queen's Tower survives.
Imperial Mansions	1889	ca. 1963		St Giles Circus	Designed by Martin & Purchase. Demolished around 1963 to make way for Centre Point.
Inner Temple, Library & Hall	1827–1868	1940		Fleet Street	Gothic library of 1827–1828 by Sir Robert Smirke and adjoining hall of 1868 by Sidney Smirke; destroyed by bombs.
Institution of Civil Engineers	1895	1910		Great George Street	Designed by Charles Barry Jr. Demolished in 1910 to make way for Government Offices Great George Street.
Jacob's Island	17th–18th centuries	Late 19th century		Bermondsey	Notorious slum, featured in Oliver Twist. Partly destroyed by fire in 1861; replaced by warehouses in the late 19th century.
James Buchanan & Co.	1900	?		High Holborn	Located at 24-27 High Holborn. Designed by Treadwell & Martin.
Junior Carlton Club	1869	1963		Pall Mall	Replacement by a 1960s building led to the loss of members and the merger of the club with the Carlton Club.
Junior Naval and Military Club	1875	1920		Pall Mall	Designed by Thomas Dudley.
Junior United Service Club	1854	1955		Regent Street	Designed by Nelson & Innes.
King's Mews	1732	1830		Trafalgar Square	Rebuilt by William Kent. Succeeded by the present Royal Mews in 1825.
Law Courts Gardens	1898	ca. 1970		Holborn	Apartments at 3-4 Clement's Inn designed by Basil Slade. Demolished around 1970 to make way for "The Towers," now known as Pankhurst House and Fawcett House (London School of Economics).
Lazard's Bank	1926	?		Old Broad Street	Designed by Gunton & Gunton with Albert Victor Heal. Located at 10-11 Old Broad Street.
Lloyd's of London	1928	1978		City of London	Designed by Sir Edwin Cooper. Demolished around 1978 and replaced by the new Lloyd's building. Only the entrance on Leadenhall Street was kept.
London & Lancashire Insurance head office	1913	1970s?		Leadenhall Street	Designed by Marcus Evelyn Collins.
London & Lancashire Insurance west end branch	1906	1941		Pall Mall	Designed by Sir Guy Dawber. Destroyed in the Blitz.
London Colosseum	1827	1874		Regent's Park	Designed by Decimus Burton, and built by Thomas Hornor at huge expense to house a 360-degree panorama of London painted by Edmund Thomas Parris.
London Institution	1815	1936		Finsbury Circus	Built by Thomas Cubitt. Founded in 1806 "to promote ... Science, Literature and the Arts", the Institution closed in 1912. The building was then used by London University.
London Opera House	1912	1957		Kingsway	Designed by Bertie Crewe for Oscar Hammerstein I.
Londonderry House	18th century	1965		Park Lane	London house of the Marquess of Londonderry, transformed during the 1820s by Benjamin Dean Wyatt and Philip Wyatt.
Magnet House	1920	1964		Kingsway	Headquarters of the General Electric Company. Designed by R. Frank Atkinson. Demolished to make way for Space House.
Mappin & Webb Building	1870	1994		Bank	Designed by John Belcher, the listed building, was demolished by developer Peter Palumbo to be replaced by Sir James Stirling's No 1 Poultry.
Marshall & Snelgrove	1870s	1969		Oxford Street	Designed by Horace Jones.
Merchant Taylors' School	c. 1675	After 1875		City of London	School founded in 1561. Located in the Manor of the Rose, Suffolk Lane – a building rebuilt after the Great Fire – until 1875.
Middlesex Hospital	1755–1757	1927		Fitzrovia	First opened in 1745. Moved in 1757, rebuilt in 1924 after being declared structurally unsound, and closed in 2005.
Millbank Penitentiary	1812–1821	1892–1903		Pimlico	Constructed as the National Penitentiary after Bentham's Panopticon was abandoned. The design proved unsatisfactory, and the building became a holding depot for convicts awaiting transportation.
Montagu House, Portman Square	1777–1781	1941		Portman Square	Built for Mrs. Elizabeth Montagu, patroness of the arts, to the design of the neoclassical architect James "Athenian" Stuart. Damaged by an incendiary bomb.
Montagu House, Whitehall	1859–1862	c. 1925		Whitehall	Palatial house in French Renaissance style, designed by William Burn for the 5th Duke of Buccleuch; used as government offices from 1917.
Moorgate Hall	1914	after 1945		Moorgate	Located at 155 Moorgate. Designed by Richardson & Gill.
New Gaiety Theatre	1903	1956		Strand	Designed by Ernest Runtz. Suffered bomb damage in World War II; demolished in 1956.
New University Club	1868	ca. 1945		St James's Street	Designed by Alfred Waterhouse. Vacated in 1938. Demolished after the War.
Newgate Prison	1770–1782	1904		Old Bailey	First built in 1188; closed 1902. The Central Criminal Court now stands on the site.
Newton's House	c. 1695	1913		Leicester Square	35 St Martin's Street was the residence of Sir Isaac Newton from 1710 to 1725.
Norfolk House	c. 1748	1938		St James Square	By Matthew Brettingham. The restored Music Room is displayed in the Victoria and Albert Museum.
Northumberland House	c. 1605	1874		Trafalgar Square	London residence of the Dukes of Northumberland.
Odeon Marble Arch	1967	2016		Oxford Street	Replaced the 1928 Regal Cinema, Marble Arch. Designed by Sir Thomas Bennett.
Old London Bridge	12th–17th centuries	1758–1831		River Thames	Houses on the bridge were demolished in 1758–1762, the rest after the completion of a new bridge by John Rennie in 1831.
Old Mansion House	1668	1929		Cheapside	Built by Sir Christopher Wren for Sir William Turner, Lord Mayor of London from 1668 to 1669.
Old Queen's Head Tavern, Islington	16th century	c. 1826		Islington	Once renowned ancient tavern in Essex Road, formerly Lower Street. Rebuilt c. 1826; still trading.
Old St Paul's Cathedral	1087–1314	1666		Ludgate Hill	In severe decline by the 17th century; destroyed in the Great Fire of London.
Olympic Park McDonald's	2012	2012		Queen Elizabeth Olympic Park	A temporary McDonald's restaurant constructed to coincide with the 2012 Summer Olympics and Paralympics. During its operation, it was the world's largest McDonald's establishment, and served 14,000 people daily. It operated for six weeks before being dismantled, with most building materials being repurposed or recycled.
Oriental Club	1827	ca. 1962		Hanover Square	Designed by Benjamin Dean Wyatt.
Oxford Arms, Warwick Lane	17th century	1876		City of London	One of the last surviving galleried inns in London.
P&O House	1924	19??		Leadenhall	At the northwest corner of Leadenhall at St Mary Axe. Designed by Collcutt & Hamp.
Pantheon	1772	1937		Oxford Street	By James Wyatt. Rebuilt after a fire in 1792. Marks & Spencer bought the building from a wine merchant and had it demolished to make way for their new store.
Pembroke House	1723–1759	1938		Whitehall	Largely rebuilt 1756–1759; demolished with other buildings in Whitehall Gardens to make way for the new MOD building. Plantation House 1936 circa 1999 a prestigious and massive office block at 31-35 Fenchurch Street.
Pope's House	17th century	1872		Lombard Street	Birthplace in 1688 of the poet Alexander Pope at Plough Court, Lombard Street.
Queen Square	1716–1725	19th century		Bloomsbury	Many of the original houses were converted for use as hospitals. The square today is largely occupied by hospital buildings.
Regal Cinema, Marble Arch	1928	1964		Oxford Street	Opened in 1928 as the Regal, became the Odeon Marble Arch in 1945. Demolished in 1964.
Regent Street	1814–1825	1895–1927		Regent Street	Originally built by John Nash as a new thoroughfare, entailing much demolition. Completely redeveloped 1895–1927.
River Fleet	17th–18th century	18th–19th century		Blackfriars	River converted into New Canal by 1680; covered, partly by New Bridge Street, prior to the opening of Blackfriars Bridge in 1769.
Rolls Chapel and Rolls House	1617–1718	1895–1896		Chancery Lane	Rolls Chapel rebuilt 1617, attributed, but without evidence, to Inigo Jones. Rolls House was built 1718 by Colen Campbell. Demolished to make way for the former Public Record Office, now the Maughan Library, King's College London.
Royal College of Physicians, Warwick Lane	1679	1887		City of London	By Robert Hooke. Used as a foundry after 1825, damaged by fire in 1879, and demolished in 1887.
Royal Aquarium	1876	1903		Westminster	Opened in 1876 and demolished in 1903.
Royal Panopticon	1854	1882		Leicester Square	Showcase venue for the best achievements in science and arts of the time. In 1858 became the Alhambra Theatre. Destroyed by fire and now the site of the Odeon Luxe Leicester Square.
St Antholin, Watling Street	1678–1684	1874		City of London	Rebuilt by Wren after the Great Fire. The roof took the form of an elliptic cupola, supported by composite columns.
St George's House	1897	19??		Eastcheap	Located at 6-8 Eastcheap. Designed by Delissa Joseph.
St Luke's Hospital for Lunatics	1786	1963		Old Street	By George Dance the Younger; closed 1916. The buildings were used as a printing works by the Bank of England until the 1950s.
St Mary Aldermanbury	1668	1940		Gresham Street	Rebuilt by Wren after the Great Fire; destroyed by bombing in 1940. Reconstructed in Fulton, Missouri, using original stones.
St Paul's School	1823	1884		Cheapside	School founded 1509; buildings rebuilt 1823 by George Smith. Demolished when the school moved to Hammersmith in 1884.
St Stephen's Club	1874	1994		Victoria Embankment	Designed by John Whichcord Jr. Demolished in 1994 to make way for Portcullis House.
St Thomas' Hospital	1699–1742	1862		Southwark	Begun in 1699 by Thomas Cartwright. Demolished to make way for a railway; the hospital relocated to Lambeth in 1871.
Savoy Hospital	1505	1816–1820		Strand	Founded by Henry VII on the site of the Savoy Palace; closed in 1702. Demolished to make way for approach to Waterloo Bridge. Savoy Chapel survives.
Scala Theatre	1905	1972		Charlotte Street	Built by Edmund Distin Maddick. Closed in 1969 and demolished in 1972.
Schomberg House	1694	1956		Pall Mall	Divided into three (Nos. 80–82) in 1769. No. 80, home of Thomas Gainsborough from 1774 to 1788, was demolished in 1850; the rest replaced by offices in 1956. Facade survives.
Serjeant's Inn, Fleet Street	18th century	1941		Fleet Street	Rebuilt by Robert Adam and taken over by the Amicable Society after the serjeants moved to Chancery Lane in 1730. Destroyed by bombing.
Serle's Place	17th century	1866		Strand	Part of a cluster of alleys and courts demolished to make way for the Royal Courts of Justice.
Shaftesbury House	1644	1882		Aldersgate Street	This building at nos. 35–38, once known as Thanet House, was built by Inigo Jones. It later became a tavern, then a lying-in hospital, then a dispensary.
Shakespeare's House	16th–17th century	1879		Aldersgate Street	No. 134, formerly the Half Moon Tavern, was falsely linked to the playwright; its site is now occupied by Barbican tube station. The nearby Shakespeare Tower preserves the association.
Sir Paul Pindar's House	17th century	1890		Bishopsgate	Became a tavern in the 18th century. Its frontage is preserved in the Victoria and Albert Museum.
South Sea House	Before 1773	c. 1903		Threadneedle Street	Home of the Baltic Exchange from 1866 to 1903.
Stone House	1923	2012		Houndsditch	Designed by Richardson & Gill. Demolished along with Staple Hall to make way for the Pan Pacific London.
Talbot Inn, Southwark	17th century	1874		Southwark	Formerly the Tabard Inn, a medieval coaching inn, burnt down in 1676 and rebuilt. The meeting place of Chaucer's pilgrims in The Canterbury Tales.
Tavistock House	c. 1805	1901		Tavistock Square	Built by James Burton. The home of Charles Dickens from 1851 to 1860, its site is now occupied by the headquarters of the British Medical Association.
Threadneedle Street Post Office	1926	?		Threadneedle Street	Designed by Edward Cropper.
Tivoli Theatre	1923	1956		The Strand	Located at 65-70 The Strand. Designed by Bertie Crewe with Gunton & Gunton. Demolished around 1956.
Westminster Hospital	1834	1951		Westminster	Now the site of the Queen Elizabeth II Centre.
Westminster Insurance	1832	1908		The Strand	Designed by Charles Robert Cockerell. Demolished in 1908. Replaced by the Embassy of Zimbabwe (originally the headquarters of the British Medical Association).
White Hart	15th–16th centuries	1829		Bishopsgate	A once-renowned ancient tavern. The building dated to 1480 and was rebuilt in 1829. Closed in 2014; the facade was integrated into a 9-storey office block.
Whitehall Palace	15th–17th centuries	1698		Whitehall	The largest palace in Europe, residence of English monarchs from 1530 to 1698. The entire palace, except for the Banqueting House and the Holbein Gate, was destroyed by fire. The Holbein Gate was then demolished in 1759.
Winchester House	16th century	1839		City of London	Great Winchester Street; built by William Paulet, 1st Marquess of Winchester.
Wych Street	16th–17th centuries	1901		Aldwych	Part of the area around Drury Lane that survived the Great Fire of London; the street contained decrepit Elizabethan houses, with projecting wooden jetties.

== See also ==
- Metropolitan Board of Works
- Gaiety Theatre, London
- List of demolished churches in the City of London
- List of public art formerly in London
