= John Drout =

English poet

John Drout (fl. 1570) was an English poet. From the title-page of his only known work, he was an attorney of Thavies Inn.

== Works ==
He is author of a black-letter tract of thirty leaves, entitled "The pityfull Historie of two louing Italians" Gionfriddo and Barnard le Vayne, which arrived in the countrey of Grece, in the time of the noble Emperor Vespasian. And translated out of Italian into Englishe meeter,’ &c., 12mo, London, 1570. In dedicating ‘this, the first frutes of my trauell,’ to Sir Francis Jobson, knt., Lieutenant of the Tower, Drout mentions his parents as still living, and expresses his own and their obligations to Jobson. In 1844 John Payne Collier reprinted twenty-five copies of this piece from a unique copy. Collier doubts whether Drout really translated the story from the Italian, and suggests that Drout describes it as a translation so that he might take advantage of the popularity of Italian novels. In his preliminary remarks upon ‘Romeo and Juliet,’ Malone, whose sole knowledge of Drout's book was derived from its entry in the ‘Stationers' Registers’, supposed it to be a prose narrative of the story on which Shakespeare's play was constructed (Malone, Shakespeare, ed. Boswell, vi. 4). It is not in prose, and only a part relates to the history of Romeo and Juliet; it is in the ordinary fourteen-syllable metre of the time, divided into lines of eight and of six syllables. It is merely valuable to the literary antiquary.
