= Drury House =

Historic building on Wych Street, London

Coordinates: 51.5131°N 0.1173°W

Drury House was a historic building on Wych Street, London. It was the house of Sir Robert Drury, after whom Drury Lane was named. It was a meeting place for Robert Devereux, 2nd Earl of Essex and his accomplices in 1601, when they were plotting against Elizabeth I.

It was later rebuilt as Craven House.
