= Thavie's Inn =

Former Inn of Chancery in London

- Interactive map of Thavie's Inn
- Type: Former Inn of Chancery
- Location: Holborn, City of London, England
- Coordinates: 51.5170°N 0.1075°W

Thavie's Inn was a former Inn of Chancery, associated with Lincoln's Inn, established at Holborn, near the site of the present side street and office block still known as Thavies Inn Buildings. Thavie's Inn is one of the earliest Inns of Chancery on record, both by date of establishment and dissolution. It remains a well-known City of London landmark, where Lloyd's Bank is situated, on the opposite side of Holborn Circus from Ely Place.

== Origin of property ==
In 1348 John Thavie, an armourer based in the parish of St Andrew's, Holborn, "left a considerable Estate towards the support of the fabric forever" of that church, a legacy which survived the English Reformation. It has been invested carefully through the centuries, and still provides for the church's current upkeep. His name has been transcribed as 'Thavy', 'Tavy' and 'Davy', i.e. the Welsh surname ('dd' in Welsh is pronounced 'th', when Anglicised as a single 'D' the pronunciation is lost). However, philologist Alexander Ellis, writing in 1871, noted that the name was pronounced Davies (IPA/'Dɑvɪz/).

In his will, the property is described as an inn "wherein the apprentices used to dwell" (note the past tense) and the assumption is that these were "Law Apprentices" who were known to lodge along Holborn, to be near the chancellor's court, i.e. at the Bishop of Lincoln's establishment there. The property in question is best located by the present Bartlett's Buildings on the south-side of Holborn.

Thavie's original property, which was left for his endowment of the church, may still have been let to 'lawyers' by Thavie's executors for income, and may have been the original home of Lincoln's Inn before it relocated to its present site on Chancery Lane. There is, however, considerable confusion as to just how the names of both the Inn of Chancery and the Inn of Court are derived.

The will's statement uses the past tense and we know from the records of the inn that the community of clerks had moved to the neighbouring house of John de Besvile; it is this site that is associated with the title of 'Thavie's Inn' and the assumption is that the transfer of that name indicates the later lawyers association as having started in the original Thavy premises.

Research by the Librarian at Lincoln's Inn in 2016 into the relationship between it and the property of John Thavy, St Andrew's benefactor, has cast doubt on the assumption that the later Inn of Chancery was based there. The reference in the Will of Thavie to his property is to 'his apprentices' and therefore these would have been armourers rather than lawyers. It seems that a Clerk of Chancery, John Davy, had neighbouring property at Besvile's Inn near Thavies Inn and these different individuals and their properties became confounded retrospectively. Besvile's Inn owned by John Davy was named after him as was Barnard's Inn named after its first principal. The Inn of Chancery was not that of the benefactor of St Andrew's but its near neighbour.

There is a reference, after the relocation but before 1400, to the clerks at Besvile's house being addressed as "treshonorable, tresage compagne de David Inn in Holborn" ie. the 'Right Honourable and Learned Company of David's Inn in Holborn'. A deed of 1419 referring to "Davesynne" is extant. All of these references are important because they are the first record of any formal establishment of lawyers. Lincoln's Inn's own records, the 'Black Books', themselves start in 1422.

== Bishops, Earls, and Thomas called 'of Lincoln' ==
The Templar Order had its first house in Holborn street from sometime in the reign of King Stephen, building one of their characteristic round churches on the site, located at what is now Southampton Buildings, next to Chancery Lane. The Templars relocated to the present Temple area in 1161, selling the first property to Robert de Chesney Bishop of Lincoln as his 'London' palace. Bishops were then also senior government officers of the Crown and those of Lincoln where often the chancellor, the king's most senior officer.

The Dominicans or 'Black Friars' arrived at Holborn in 1224, extending and developing their estate in Holborn and southwards to Fleet Street. It is alleged that the Archbishop of Canterbury induced them to relocate to the nearby Thames side and eastern side of the Fleet in 1279, to an area better known since then as 'Blackfriars'. They sold their old property to Henry de Lacy, Earl of Lincoln in that year. It is the claim of Lincoln's Inn that it derives its name from the Earl as its patron.

In 1369, the Benedictine cleric, the Abbot of Malmesbury, also required a London establishment for his affairs and the Benedictine Order acquired "Lyncolnesynne", that of one Thomas of Lincoln, who was a Serjeant at law, and thus a local landlord unrelated to the ecclesiastical or lay magnates bearing a similar title/name. The Abbot did not occupy all of the buildings himself, instead letting them out to various tenants, perhaps some of them law apprentices and their masters. Thomas of Lincoln's property is located at what is now Furnivall Street, on the south-side of Holborn. This former site of "Lyncolnesynne" was close to the Thavie's Inn and Furnival's Inn sites.

The derivation of the present Lincoln's Inn name could simply be in reference to the group who migrated to the present 'Chichester Inn' site of Lincoln's Inn, in Chancery Lane, from this earlier Thomas's inn. At the latest, this was done by 1442, so that the group must have occupied at some time before something called 'Lincoln's Inn'. The Black Books start some twenty years before this move. Thavy's property itself was, however, a sub-division of Earl Henry de Lacy's manor so that the association of lawyers may have acquired their collective name from any informal affinity with the leading magnate's local interests.

As to why the Inns of Chancery became subject to the Inns of Court is a moot point; it is, however, notable that the two subject to Lincoln's Inn (Thavie's and Furnival's) were not adjacent to its present site, unlike the dispositions of the other Chancery Inns to their patron Inns, but further east actually closer to the Thomas de Lincoln site.

Lincoln's Inn sold Thavie's Inn for redevelopment in 1785 so the proceeds could be used towards the completion of 'Stone Buildings'.
