= Staple Inn =

Tudor building in London, England

Coordinates: 51°31′04.68″N 0°06′40.28″W

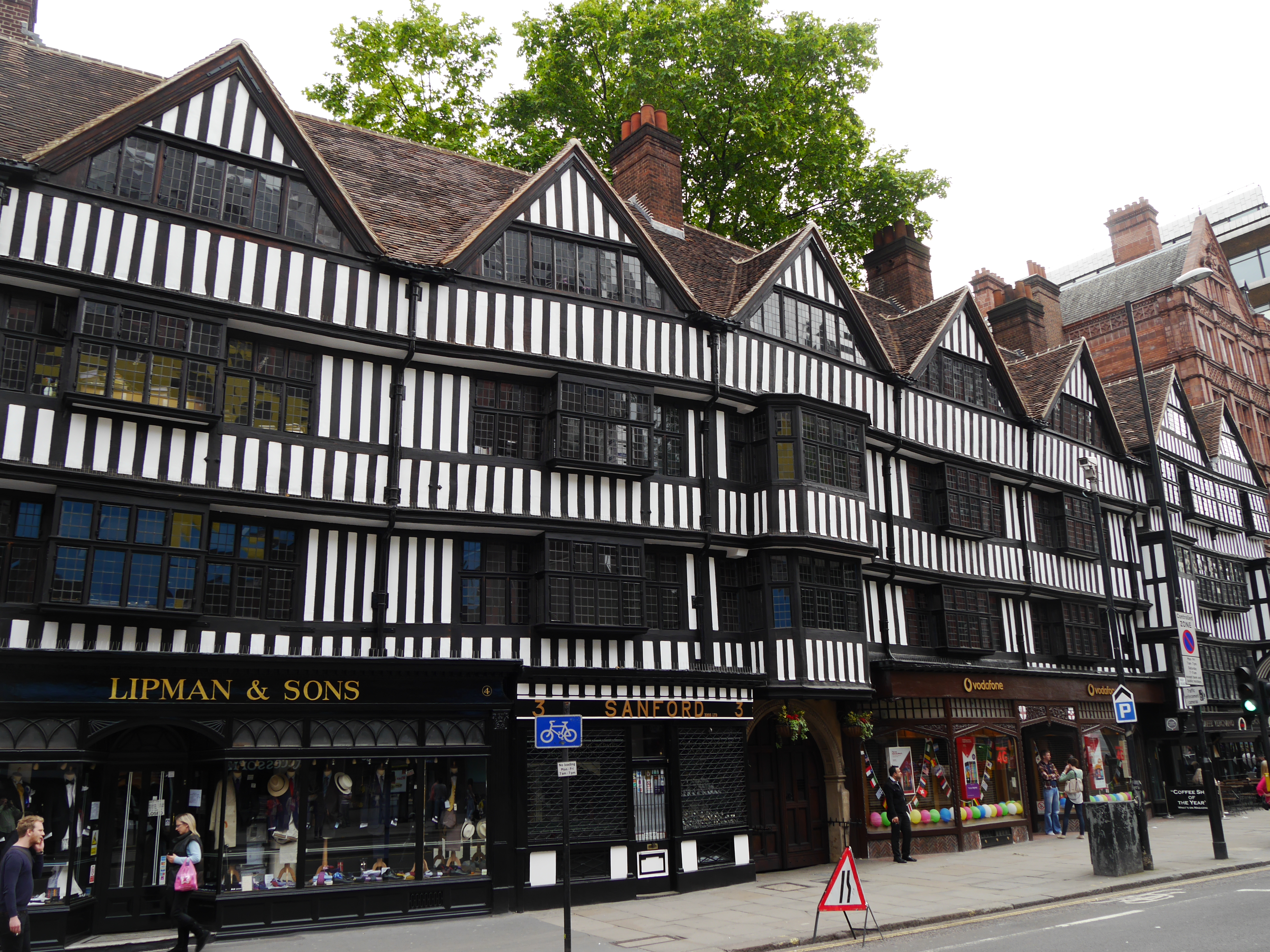
Staple Inn in 2014

Staple Inn is a part-Tudor building on the south side of High Holborn street in the City of London, England. Located near Chancery Lane tube station, it is used as the London venue for meetings of the Institute and Faculty of Actuaries, and is the last surviving Inn of Chancery. It was designated a Grade I listed building in 1974.

== History ==
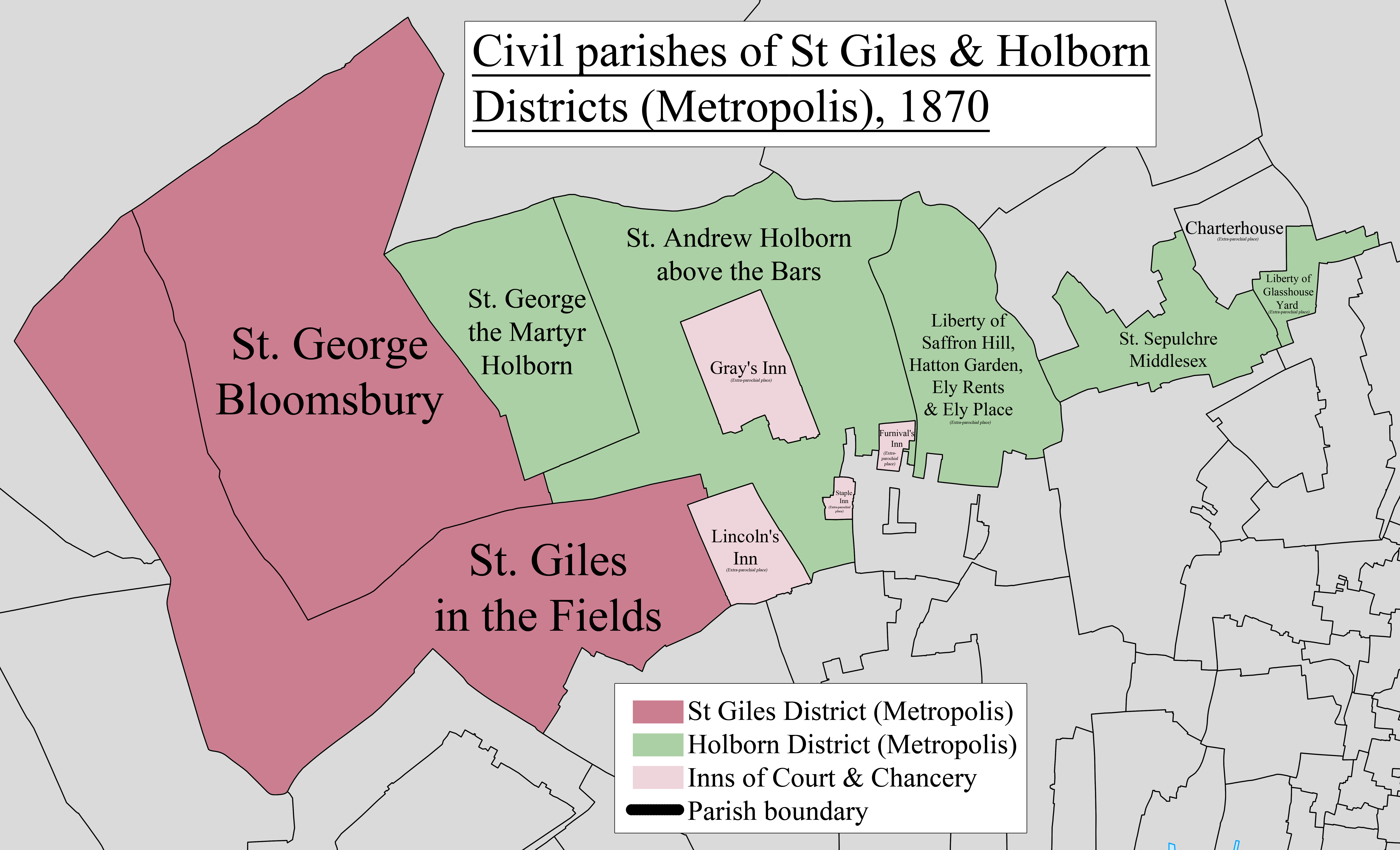
A map showing the boundaries of the Inn in 1870

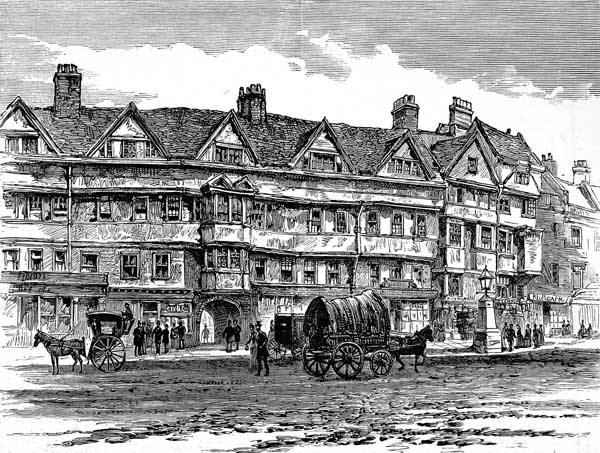
Staple Inn in 1886

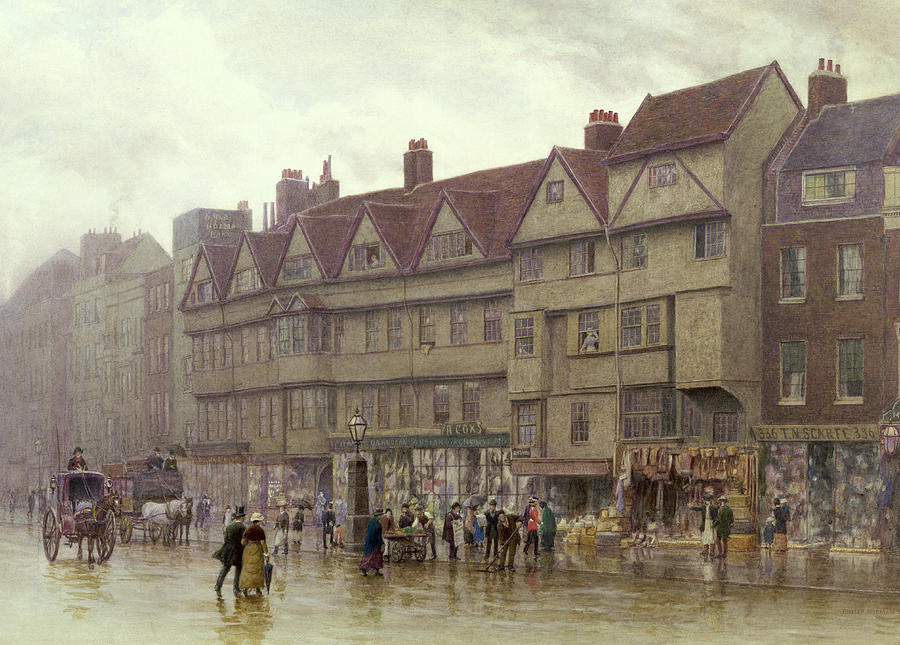
Staple Inn Holborn (1887) by Philip Norman

It was originally attached to Gray's Inn, which is one of the four Inns of Court. The Inns of Chancery fell into decay in the 19th century. All of them were dissolved, and most were demolished. Staple Inn is the only one which survives largely intact. It was an extra-parochial area until 1858 and then a civil parish. It became part of the Metropolitan Borough of Holborn in 1900 and was abolished on 31 March 1930 to form Holborn. At the 1921 census (the last before the abolition of the parish), Staple Inn had a population of 17.

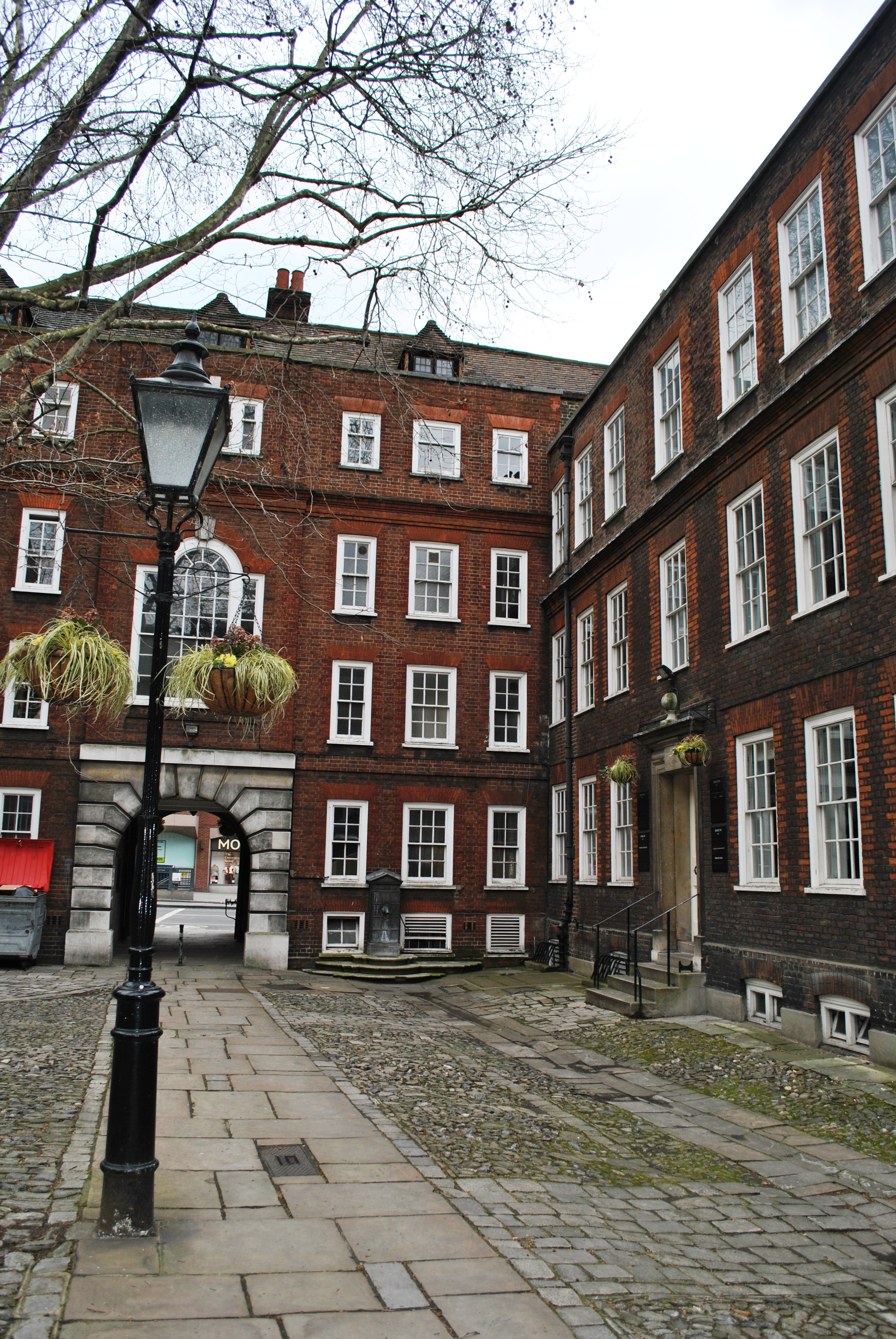
Staple Inn inner courtyard

On 1 April 1994, boundary changes meant that the Inn was transferred from the London Borough of Camden to the City of London (and the City ward of Farringdon Without).

It was the model for the fictitious Inn of Court "Bacon's Inn" in Arthur Moore's 1904 novel Archers of the Long Bow. The ancient switch-tailed double pump referred to was replaced in 1937 by a mock single pump, to mark the site.

=== Wool staple ===
Staple Inn dates from 1585. The building was once the wool staple, where wool was weighed and taxed. It survived the Great Fire of London, was extensively damaged by a Nazi German Luftwaffe aerial bomb in 1944 but was subsequently restored. It has a distinctive timber-framed façade, cruck roof and an internal courtyard.

The historic interiors include a great hall, used by the Institute and Faculty of Actuaries. The ground-floor street frontage is let to shops and restaurants, required to use plainer signage than they do on less sensitive buildings. For a time, the building appeared on the packaging of Old Holborn tobacco.

== See also ==
- List of buildings that survived the Great Fire of London
