= Super Specula =

Super Specula or Super Speculam was a decretal issued by Pope Honorius III in 1219 which had the effect of preventing the teaching of Roman civil law in Paris with the object of suppressing it in favor of canon law. It contained three parts: Sane licet sancta ecclesia, Sane licet fallax, and Volumus et Mandamus.

== Sane licet sancta ecclesia ==
The first part of the decretal was included in the Quinta Compilatio under the heading De Constitutionibus. It positions canon law as more necessary than Roman empire's civil law.

== Sane licet fallax ==
Titled Ne clerici, vel Monachi secularibus negotiis se immiseceant in the Quinta Compilatio, this section condemns the secular activities of clergy and monks, particularly mixing with the public in taverns, practicing Roman civil law or surgery, and teaching Roman civil law. The beginning of this passage gives the decretal its name.

== Volumus et Mandamus ==
The Quinta Compilatio designates this part De Magistris. It discusses the circumstances under which fees for instruction, scholarly advice, and degrees are or are not simony.
