= Lyon's Inn =

Coordinates: 51.513°N 0.119°W

Lyon's Inn was one of the Inns of Chancery attached to London's Inner Temple. Founded some time during or before the reign of Henry V, the Inn educated lawyers including Edward Coke and John Selden, although it was never one of the larger Inns. It eventually developed into an institution of disrepute rather than of respect, and by the time it was dissolved in 1863 it was inhabited by only the worst lawyers.

== History ==
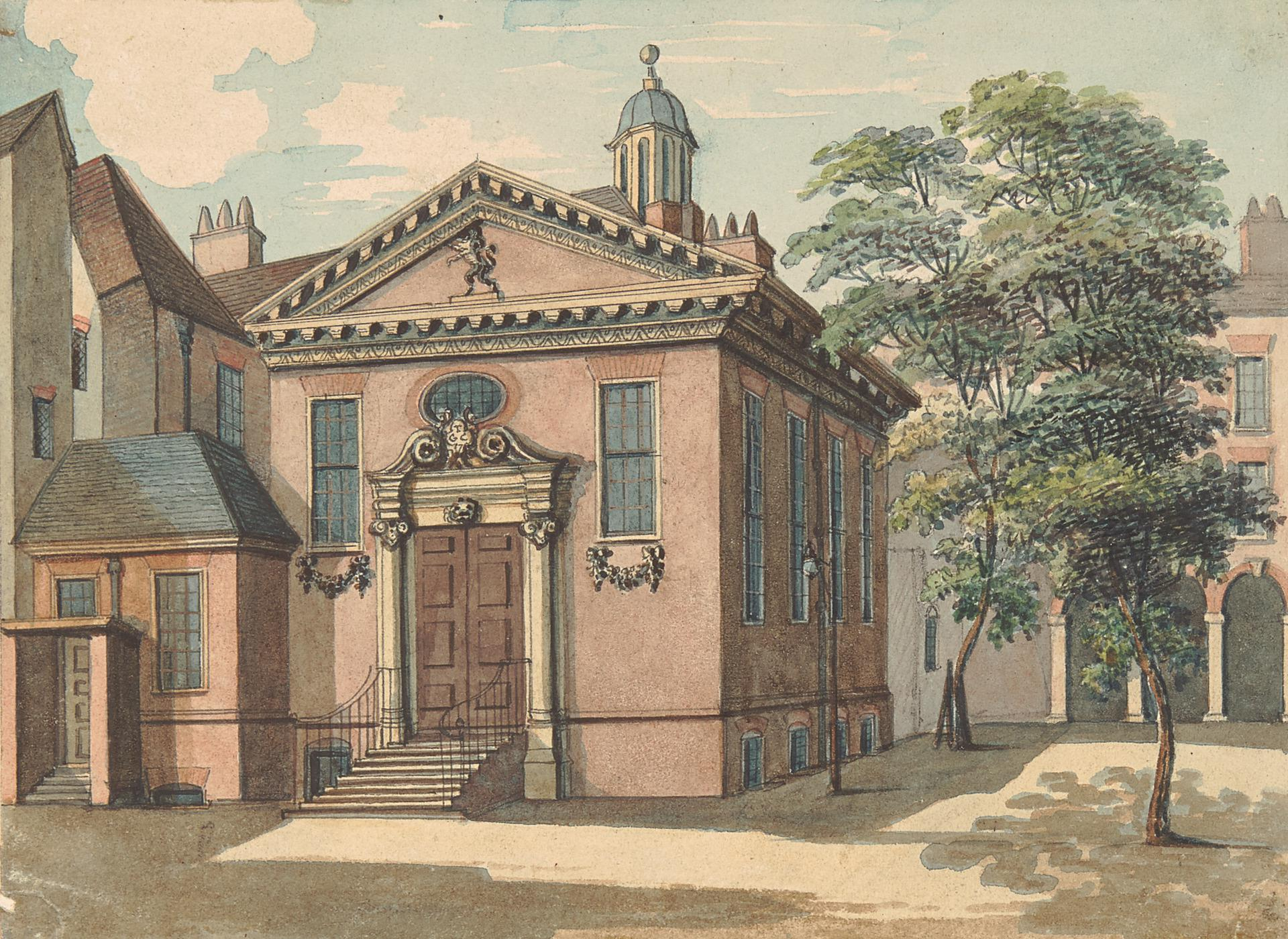
Lyon's Inn, watercolour by Samuel Ireland c. 1794

It is believed that the Inns of Chancery evolved in tandem with the Inns of Court. During the 12th and 13th century the law was taught in the City of London, primarily by the clergy. During the 13th century two events happened which destroyed this form of legal education - firstly a decree by Henry III of England that no institutes of legal education could exist in the City of London, and second a papal bull that prohibited the clergy from teaching the law. As a result, the system of legal education fell apart, and the lawyers instead settled immediately outside the City of London as close as possible to Westminster Hall, where Magna Carta provided for a permanent court. This was the small village of Holborn, where they inhabited "hostels" or "inns", which later took their name from the landlord of the Inn in question.

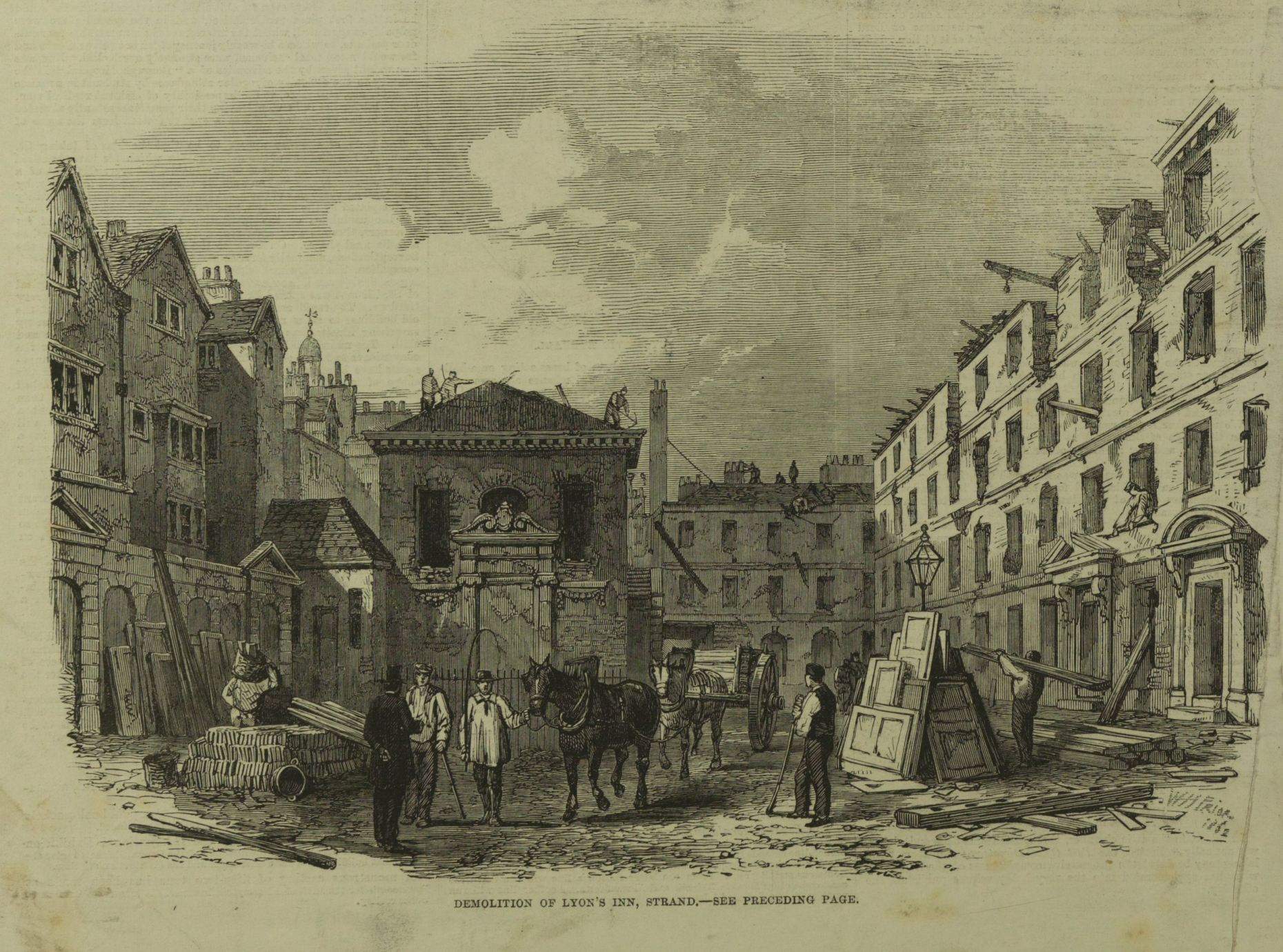
'Demolition of Lyon's Inn, Strand' by W.H. Prior accompanying the article "A Little Talk About Lyon's Inn" in The Illustrated London News, 27 December 1862, showing the north, south and west sides of the Inn with the east end of the Hall in course of removal

The Inns of Chancery sprung up around the Inns of Court, and took their name and original purpose from the chancery clerks, who used the buildings as hostels and offices where they would draft their writs. For several centuries, education at one of the Inns of Chancery was the first step towards becoming a barrister. A student would first join one of the Inns of Chancery, where he would be taught in the form of moots and rote learning. Lyon's Inn was located near Wych Street, and started off as a hostel "held at the sign of the lyon". It was an Inn of Chancery from at least the time of Henry V, although little more precise than that is known; records date from 1413. It was finally purchased by the students and professors during the reign of Henry VIII. Lyon's Inn was a small Inn, with eighty students at its peak during the time of Elizabeth I, and educated people as noted as Sir Edward Coke, Sir Lewes Lewkenor Master of the Ceremonies and John Selden. The Inn was, at the best of times, governed by a Treasurer and twelve "Ancients".

Lyon's Inn became a disreputable institution that "perished of public contempt long before it came to the hammer and the pick". By the time it was dissolved it was inhabited only by the lowest lawyers and those struck off the rolls, and when surveyed it was found that it was run by only two Ancients, neither of whom had any idea what their duties were, and the Inn had not dined for over a century. The Inn was dissolved in 1863 and replaced with the third Globe Theatre.

== Bibliography ==
- Pearce, Robert Richard (1848). History of the Inns of Court and Chancery: With Notices of Their Ancient Discipline, Rules, Orders, and Customs, Readings, Moots, Masques, Revels, and Entertainments. R. Bentley. OCLC 16803021.
- Loftie, W J (1895). The Inns of court and chancery. New York: Macmillan & co. OCLC 592845.
- Steel, H. Spenden (1907). "Origin and History of English Inns of Chancery". The Virginia Law Register. 13 (8). Virginia Law Review. doi:10.2307/1103274. ISSN 1547-1357. JSTOR 1103274.
- Watt, Francis; Dunbar Plunket Barton; Charles Benham (1928). The Story of the Inns of Court. Boston: Houghton Mifflin. OCLC 77565485.
