= Clifford's Inn =

Inn of Chancery

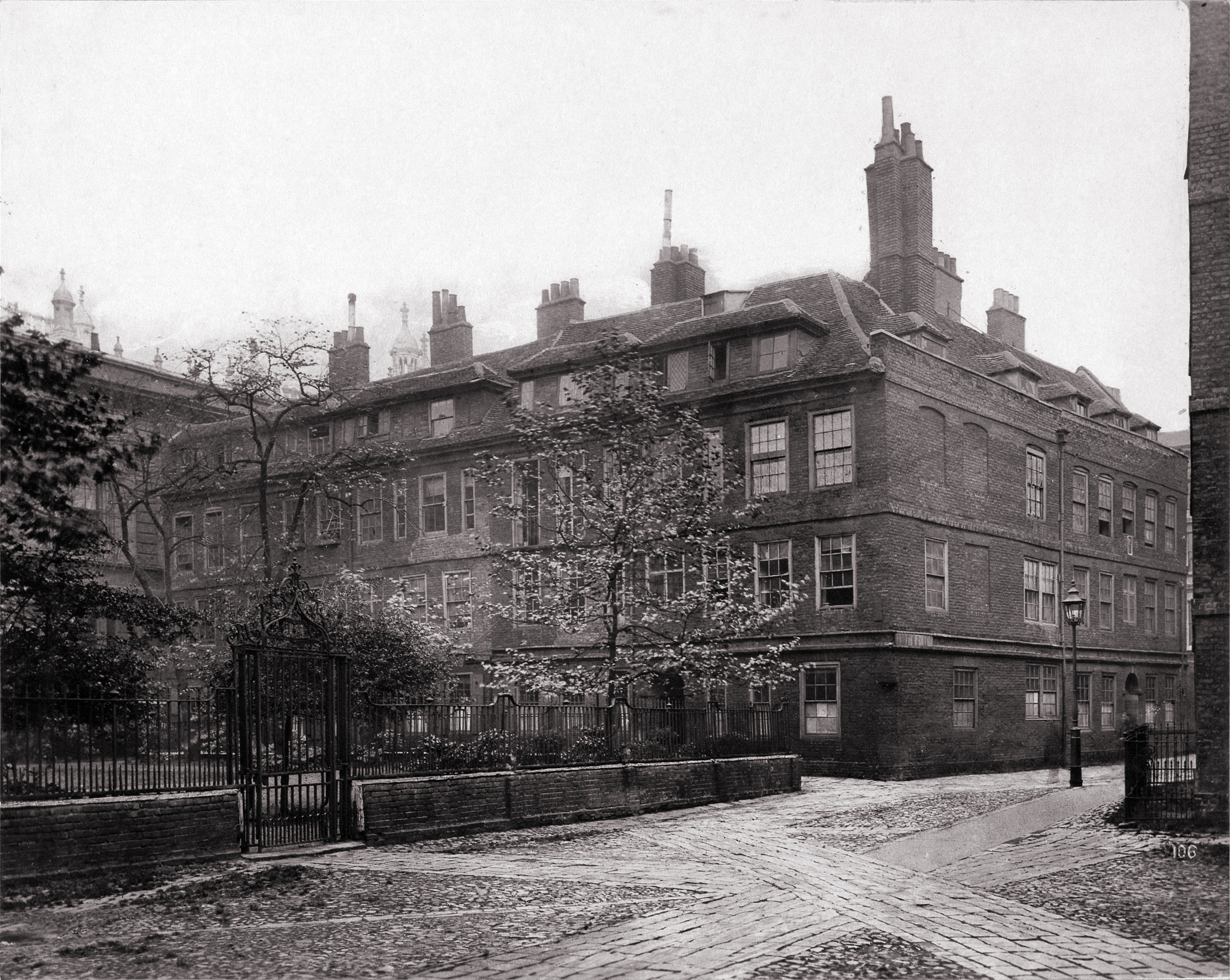
- Clifford's Inn in 1885
- Type: Law
- Active: 1344–1903
- Founders: Isabel, Dowager Lady de Clifford
- Location: Fetter Lane, Farringdon Without, London, England EC4; 51.51421°N 0.11046°W

Clifford's Inn is the name of both a former Inn of Chancery in London and a present mansion block on the same site. It is located between Fetter Lane and Clifford's Inn Passage (which runs between Fleet Street and Chancery Lane) in the City of London. The Inn was founded in 1344 and refounded 15 June 1668. It was dissolved in 1903, and most of its original structure was demolished in 1934, save for a gateway which survives. It was both the first Inn of Chancery to be founded and the last to be demolished. The mansion block was built in the late 1930s preserving the name.

Originally, Clifford's Inn was engaged in educating students in jurisprudence, Edward Coke and John Selden being two of its best known alumni. It also accommodated graduates preparing for ordination, such as the novelist Samuel Butler and those studying for other professions. In 1903, the members of Clifford's Inn reached the view that the establishment had outlived its purpose in education, and unanimously voted to dissolve its incorporation. Its remaining funds were donated to the Attorney General for England and Wales.

Subsequent to its dissolution as an Inn of Chancery, Clifford's Inn has housed offices, such as The Senior Courts Costs Office. In apartments above, Virginia Woolf, Sir John Stuttard (679th Lord Mayor), Sir Ernest Ryder (High Court Judge) and Lord Denning have been residents.

== History as an Inn of Chancery ==
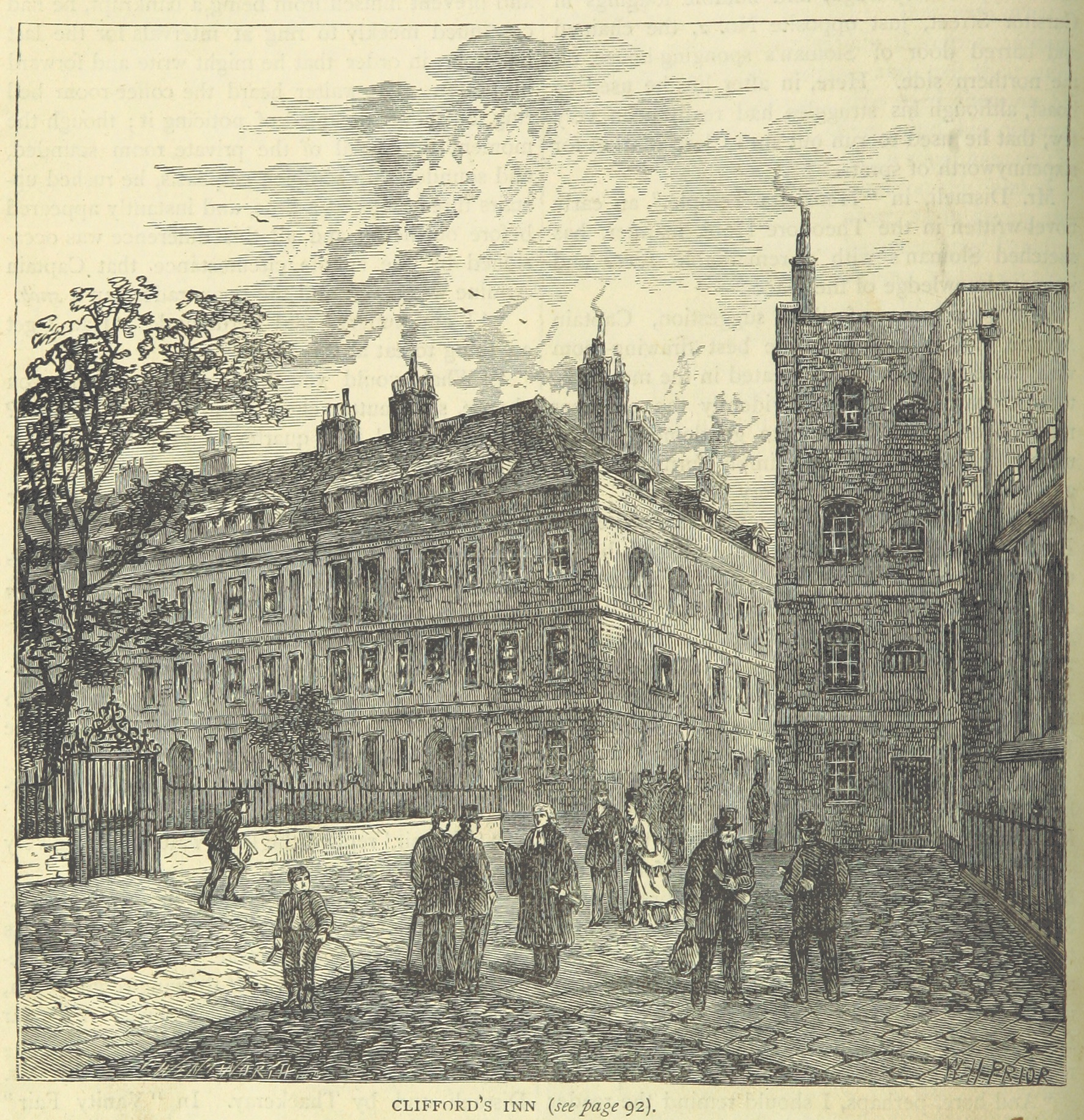
1873 illustration

The Inns of Chancery evolved in tandem with the Inns of Court. During the 12th and 13th centuries Law was taught in the City of London primarily by the clergy.

However, during the 13th century two events happened which diminished this form of legal education: firstly, a decree by Henry III of England stating that no institutes of legal education could exist in the City of London; and, secondly, a Papal Bull prohibiting clergy from teaching law in London.

Consequently, the system of legal education dispersed, with lawyers instead settling on the outskirts of the City of London but as close as possible to Westminster Hall, where the signing of the Magna Carta had led to the establishment of a permanent court.

The neighbourhood of what had been the small village of Holborn evolved into habitations, i.e. "hostels" or "inns", which over time became known by the name of their respective landlords.

Inns of Chancery developed around the Inns of Court, establishing their name and ultimate purpose from the Chancery Clerks, who used these buildings not only as accommodation, but as offices from where to draft their writs. Since the Middle Ages, education at one of these Inns has been considered the customary step to becoming a barrister. Therefore, a student or pupil entered one of the Inns of Chancery, where he would be taught in the latest form of moots and rote learning.

The land on which Clifford's Inn is situated was granted to Lord de Clifford on 24 February 1310, and it is from his family that the Inn derives its name. Upon Lord de Clifford's death in 1314 his estates passed via his brother, Roger, to his nephew, Robert de Clifford, 3rd Baron de Clifford after whose death in 1344, his widow (Isabel, Lady de Clifford) granted use of the land to students of the law for £10 annually. It was the first recorded Inn of Chancery, although its official date of incorporation is not known.

The Society of Clifford's Inn concluded purchase of the freehold of the property on 29 March 1618 from its then owner, Francis Clifford, 4th Earl of Cumberland, for the sum of £600, with the proviso that it should pay him £4 per year rent thereafter for use of the land and to keep a set of chambers available for those barristers of his choosing.

On the death of the 5th Earl, the earldom of Cumberland became extinct and the barony of Clifford (cr. by writ 1628) passed to his daughter and sole heiress, Lady Elizabeth Boyle, Countess of Thanet. After protracted family legal wranglings the rights and privileges to Clifford's Inn (together with the title of Hereditary Sheriff of Westmorland) devolved upon his cousin, Lady Anne Clifford (de jure Baroness de Clifford), which estates remained with her descendants until the early 19th century.

Noted students in the law at Clifford's Inn include Sir Edward Coke and John Selden. In 1609 Clifford’s Inn was home to the legal clerk Thomas Potts (clerk) who was responsible for writing the account of the Pendle witches, The Wonderfull Discoverie of Witches in the Countie of Lancaster. Charles Dickens provides glimpses of Clifford’s Inn in the nineteenth century. The building is named in four of his novels: in Pickwick Papers a body is concealed, in Bleak House Melchisedek has chambers here; in Little Dorrit Edward Dorrit (Tip) languished as a clerk here for six months; in Our Mutual Friend it is a “quiet place” for John Rokesmith to speak with Noddy Boffin. Additionally it is likely that it is described in other Dickens novels without being directly named. The Dickens Fellowship was located in Clifford’s Inn in 1918. The assertion that Charles Dickens was himself briefly a resident in Clifford’s Inn in 1843 may derive from the Dickens Fellowship of this period.

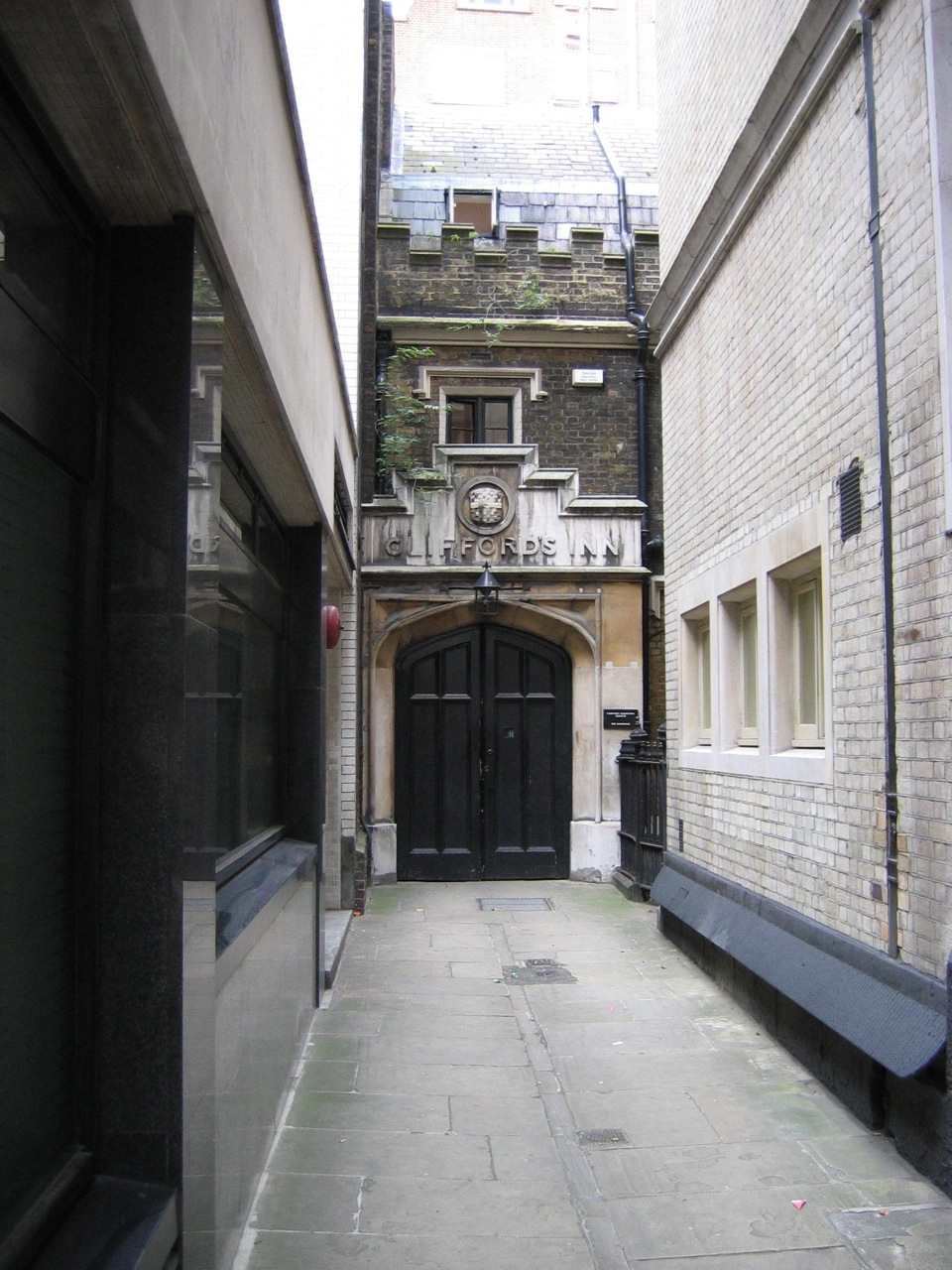
Clifford's Inn Passage, London EC4

By 1903 it was apparent that the Inn was superfluous to requirements of legal education, so its members unanimously agreed to dissolve the society, selling the buildings and giving its residue to the Attorney General for England and Wales, the nominal head of the Bar, to do with it as it so wished. The auction of the assets took place on 14 May of that year (i.e. 1903), and the Inn was sold "at a ridiculously low price", in the sum of £100,000. The buildings of the Inn were later demolished in 1934, save its gatehouse (at Clifford's Inn Passage), which survives. This gatehouse was designed by Decimus Burton, a student of the Inn from 1830 to 1834.

== Governance and Structure of the Inn of Chancery ==
Clifford's Inn was ruled by its council, which was led by a Principal. As well as the Principal, the Council consisted of twelve barristers, all elected by the Inn members and who enjoyed certain rights; they could hold chambers whenever they wanted and sat at a separate upper table to dine. The Principal was elected by the entire Inn's membership and was tasked with overseeing its day-to-day running and supervision of the Inn's servants; his privileges included the right to choose from any one of 18 sets of chambers and a generous allowance for beer. Principals were originally elected for life, but subsequent to a council order dated 15 June 1668 they were subject to re-election every three years. However, between 1668 and the last election in 1890, only 21 men served as Principal of Clifford's Inn, since "once elected, always elected" unless infirm became customary practice.

The Clifford family's protracted title dispute caused confusion in Clifford's Inn governance for some time, and during this period usage of a differenced coat of arms is recorded: "Chequée Or and Azure, a Fess Gules, a Bordure bezantée of the Third". Clifford's Inn later resumed its (or adopted) usage of the ancient Clifford arms, namely: "Chequée Or and Azure, a Fess Gules".

Although generally considered to be an adjunct to the Inner Temple, the members of Clifford's Inn always maintained that they were a separate entity. As a mark of that "independence" the Inner Temple benchers began a tradition of sending Clifford's Inn a message once a year, to which of course a reply was neither likely nor expected!

== After the Dissolution of the Inn of Chancery ==
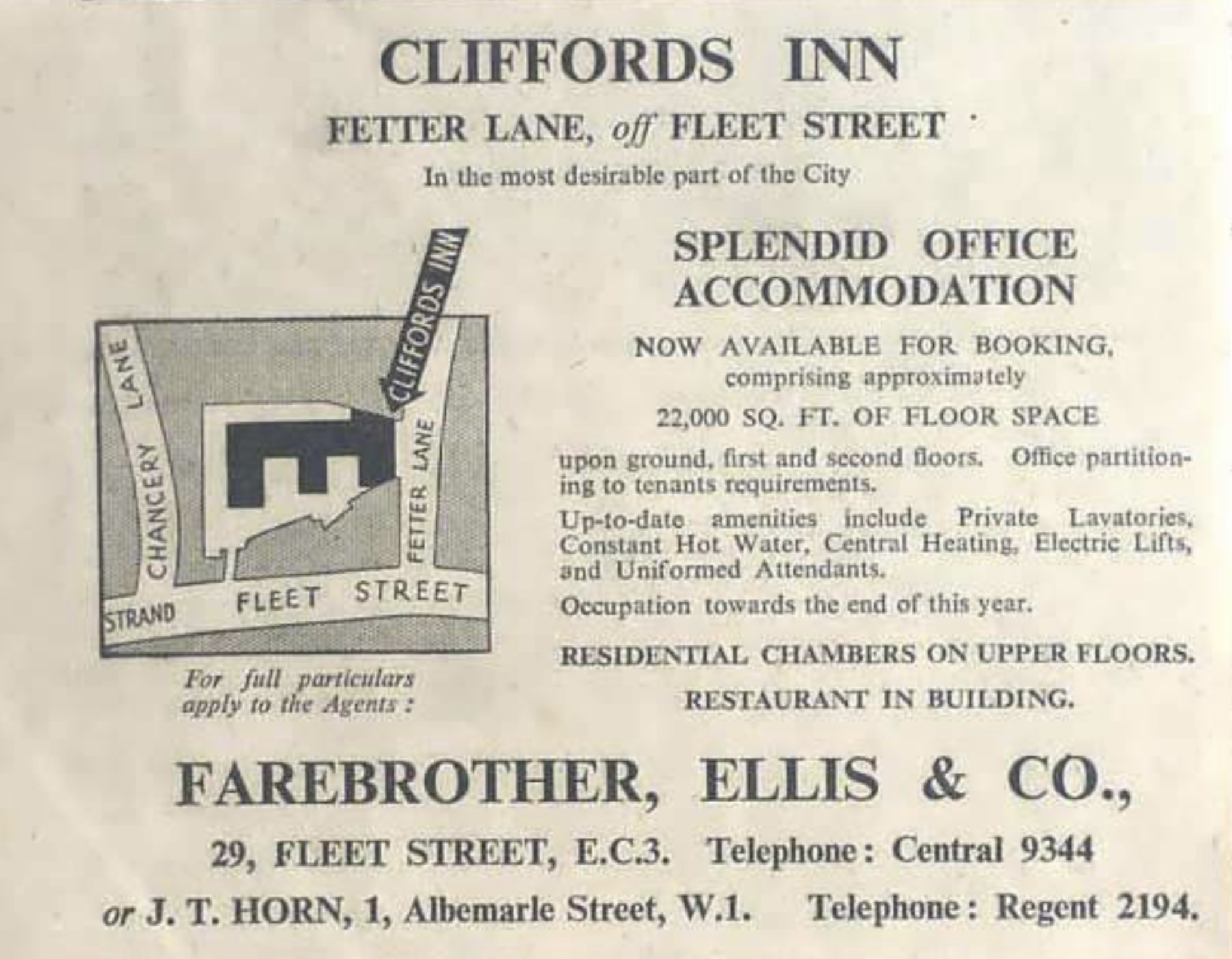
Clifford’s Inn 1937 Sale

Following the 1903 dissolution of the Inn of Chancery, the freehold of Clifford’s Inn was sold in two lots. A smaller part adjacent to Chancery Lane became in 1910 the site of an office building, now 5 Chancery Lane. The larger section containing most of the long-standing buildings of Clifford’s Inn continued to be used for mixed commercial and residential purposes. It became home to organisations including Society of Women Writers and Journalists, London Typographical Society, London Positivist Society and Art Workers' Guild. Apartments within the building continued to be occupied by people working in law, but additionally are found photographers, tailors, architects, and artists including both painting and sculpture. Virginia Woolf and her husband Leonard Woolf lived at Clifford’s Inn 1912-1913 in flat 13, becoming residents immediately after their honeymoon.

Most of the old buildings of Clifford’s Inn were demolished in 1935, replaced by the 1936-7 building of serviced apartments above offices. Lord Denning was resident in the 1970s. The Fetter Lane façade was added in 2014, designed by Gibberd Architects, and clad in Portland stone and Carrara marble.

== See also ==
- Inns of Chancery
- List of demolished buildings and structures in London

== Bibliography ==
- Griggs, F.L. (1903). "Clifford's Inn and the Protection of Ancient Buildings". The Burlington Magazine for Connoisseurs. 2 (4). ISSN 0951-0788.
- Loftie, W J (1895). The Inns of court and chancery. New York: Macmillan & co. OCLC 592845.
- Norman, Philip (1903). "Clifford's Inn". The Burlington Magazine for Connoisseurs. 1 (2). ISSN 0951-0788.
- Steel, H. Spenden (1907). "Origin and History of English Inns of Chancery". The Virginia Law Register. 13 (8). Virginia Law Review: 585–593. doi:10.2307/1103274. ISSN 1547-1357. JSTOR 1103274.
- Watt, Francis; Dunbar Plunket Barton; Charles Benham (1928). The Story of the Inns of Court. Boston: Houghton Mifflin. OCLC 77565485.
- Woolrych, Humphry William (1826). The Life of the Right Honourable Sir Edward Coke. London: J. & W. T. Clarke. OCLC 5010520.
- Hay-Edwards, C.M. (1912). A History of Clifford's Inn. London: Thomas Werner Laurie. OCLC 5939730.
