= Inns of Chancery =

Former legal buildings and institutions in London

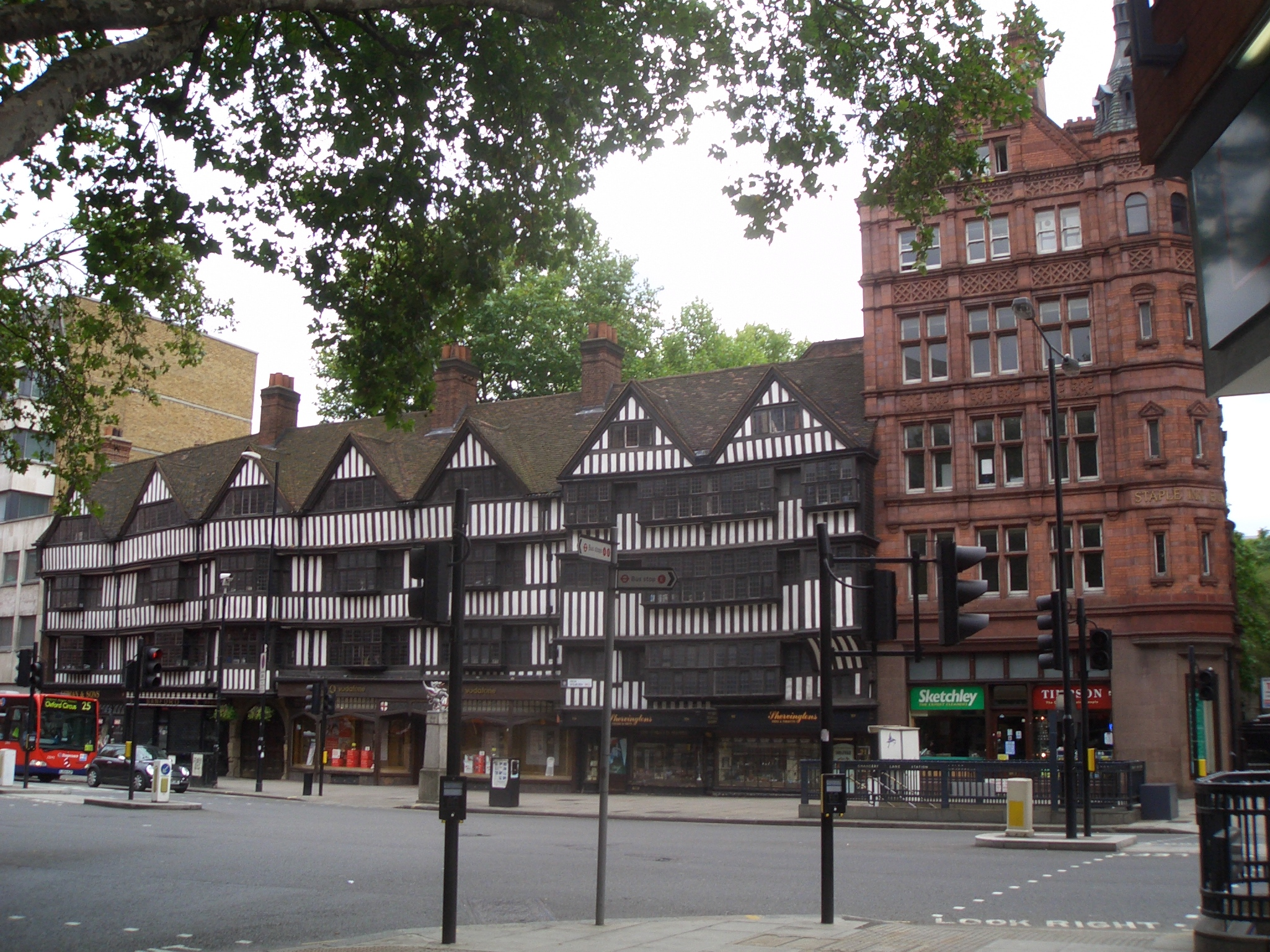
Staple Inn, the only Inn of Chancery building to survive largely intact

The Inns of Chancery or Hospida Cancellarie were a group of buildings and legal institutions in Holborn, London, initially attached to the Inns of Court and used as offices for the clerks of chancery, from which they drew their name. Existing from at least 1344, the Inns gradually changed their purpose, and became both the offices and accommodation for solicitors (as the Inns of Court were to barristers) and a place of initial training for barristers.

The practice of training barristers at the Inns of Chancery had died out by 1642, and the Inns instead became dedicated associations and offices for solicitors. With the founding of the Society of Gentleman Practisers in 1739 and the Law Society of England and Wales in 1825, a single unified professional association for solicitors, the purpose of the Inns died out, and after a long period of decline the last one (Clement's Inn) was sold in 1903 and demolished in 1934.

== History ==
The Inns of Chancery evolved in tandem with the Inns of Court. During the 12th and early 13th centuries the law was taught in the City of London, primarily by the clergy. But during the 13th century an event occurred which ended legal education by the Church. A papal bull in 1218 prohibited the clergy from practising in the secular, common law courts. As a result, law began to be practised and taught by laymen instead of by clerics. To protect their schools from competition, Henry II and Henry III issued proclamations prohibiting the teaching of the civil law within the City of London. These schools were based in hostels or "inns", which later took their name from the landlord of the inn in question.

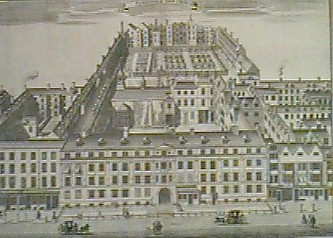
Early-18th-century engraving of Furnival's Inn by Sutton Nicholls

The Inns of Chancery sprung up around the Inns of Court, and took their name and original purpose from the chancery clerks, who used the buildings as hostels and offices where they would draft their writs. As with the Inns of Court the precise dates of founding of the Inns of Chancery are unknown, but the one commonly said to be the oldest is Clifford's Inn, which existed from at least 1344. Thavie's Inn, founded in 1349, is considered to be the next oldest, and several legal historians mistakenly considered it the oldest of them all.

For several centuries, education at one of the Inns of Chancery was the first step towards becoming a barrister. A student would first join one of the Inns of Chancery, where he would be taught in the form of moots and rote learning. He would also be taught by Readers sent from the Inn of Court that his Inn of Chancery was attached to, who would preside over the moots and discuss cases with the students. At the end of each legal term, particularly promising students would be transferred to the parent Inn of Court and begin the next stage of their education. By 1461 there were approximately 100 students studying at the Inns of Chancery at any one time.

At the same time, the Inns of Chancery were used as accommodation and offices by solicitors, the other branch of the English legal profession. During the 16th and 17th centuries the purpose of the Inns changed. After the outbreak of the First English Civil War in 1642, the practice of teaching barristers in the Inns ceased, and as a result the Inns of Chancery became a dedicated association for solicitors instead, offering offices and accommodation. The foundation of the Society of Gentlemen Practisers and Law Society of England and Wales in 1739 and 1825 respectively as professional bodies for the solicitors' profession relegated the Inns of Chancery to little more than eccentric dining clubs, and they were gradually dissolved and sold. In 1897 a popular book reported that nobody could remember the purpose of the buildings and that an 1850 investigation had failed to uncover their origins. The last Inn to be sold was Clement's Inn, which was sold in 1903, and demolished in 1934.

== Inns ==
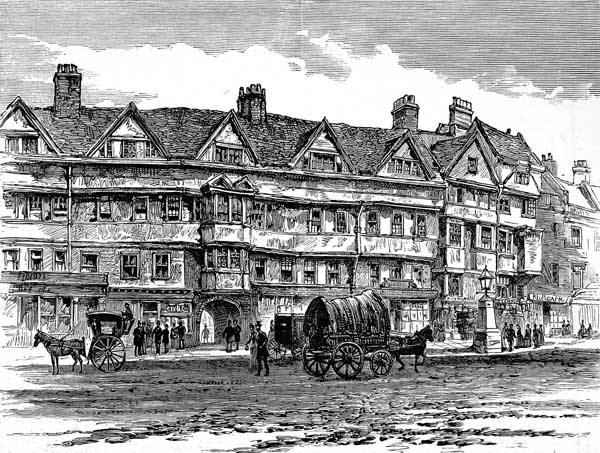
Staple Inn in 1886

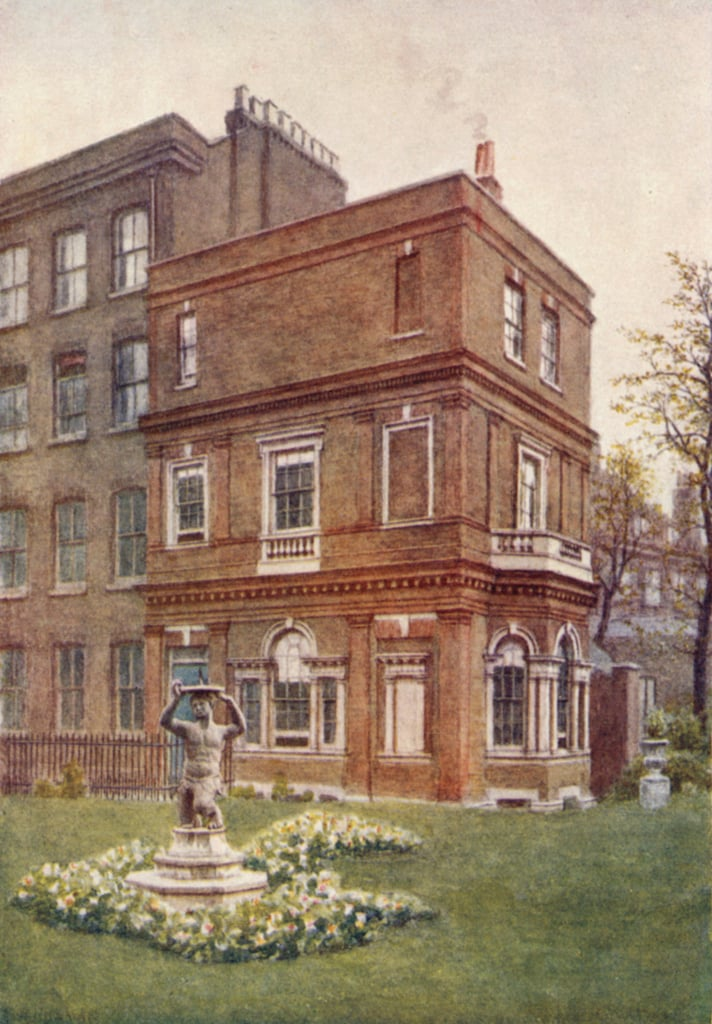
Garden House, Clements Inn, 1883 by Philip Norman

John Fortescue wrote of ten Inns of Chancery, each one attached to an Inn of Court "like Maids of Honour to a Princess". Only nine are known of in detail; the other was St George's Inn.

The ten Inns were:

- Clement's Inn, Lyon's Inn and Clifford's Inn attached to the Inner Temple,
- St George's Inn, Strand Inn, and New Inn attached to the Middle Temple,
- Furnival's Inn and Thavie's Inn attached to Lincoln's Inn, and
- Staple Inn and Barnard's Inn attached to Gray's Inn.

(An eleventh Inn of Chancery, the Outer Temple, was said to exist by the legal historian John Baker in 2008. This is denied by other writers.)

Many Inns were originally independent of the Inns of Court, and fell in and out of allegiance with them, with some claiming independence right up to the nineteenth century. Most Inns became directly attached to Inns of Court during the sixteenth century, however, when the Inns of Court began charging higher acceptance fees to students trained in independent Inns of Chancery than they did to students trained in "their" Inns of Chancery.

=== Inner Temple attachments ===
Clement's Inn was the last to be dissolved: it was shut down in 1903. Located near St Clement Danes, the Inn was also named after Saint Clement and adopted his coat of arms, with a large letter C in sable. The buildings were completely rebuilt in the 19th century in the Queen Anne style. Noted members included Sir Edmund Saunders, and William Shakespeare made Justice Shallow, a character in Henry IV, Part 2, a member of the Inn. Members were noted as "a wild lot" known for their drinking and parties. In its later years the Inn was a poor one, and had no library or chapel, with most of the funds being spent on repairs and maintenance for the building.

Lyon's Inn was "a place of considerable antiquity", with records from 1413. Originally a hostel, it was purchased by the inhabitants and turned into an Inn of Chancery. Initially a small but respected Inn that educated people as noted as Sir Edward Coke, Lyon's Inn became a disreputable institution that "perished of public contempt long before it came to the hammer and the pick". By the time it was dissolved it was inhabited only by the lowest lawyers and those struck off the rolls, and when surveyed it was found that it was run by only two Ancients, neither of whom had any idea what their duties were, and the Inn had not dined for over a century. The Inn was dissolved in 1863, pulled down in 1868 and replaced with the third Globe Theatre.

Clifford's Inn was the oldest of the Inns of Chancery, and was first mentioned in 1344. Although generally considered a dependent of the Inner Temple, its members always maintained that they were independent. As a note of that "independence" it became custom for the Inner Temple to send them a message once a year, which would be received but deliberately not replied to. Their coat of arms was a modified form of the Clifford family arms, with "cheque or and azure, a fess gules, a bordure, bezantée, of the third." Noted students include John Selden; Sir Edward Coke was also said to have studied there, but historical records find no evidence of this, and he was always associated with Lyon's Inn more than Clifford's.

=== Middle Temple attachments ===
The first lawyers to occupy the premises which later became the Middle Temple came from St George's Inn, arriving by 1346. The inn was later deserted in favour of New Inn.

Strand Inn, also called Chester Inn, was the shortest-lived of the Inns of Chancery. It was founded in the fifteenth century, but it was pulled down in the 1540s by Lord Somerset in his role as Lord Protector so that he could build Somerset House. The students instead went to New Inn, and Strand Inn was absorbed into that Inn. Thomas Occleve was said to have studied at Strand Inn.

New Inn was founded in the late 15th century on the premises of Our Lady Inn, a hostel. Noted students included Sir Thomas More, who attended New Inn before going to Lincoln's Inn. The buildings of New Inn were pulled down in 1902 to make way for a road between Holborn and the Strand. After the destruction of Strand Inn, New Inn was the only Inn of Chancery left attached to the Middle Temple.

=== Lincoln's Inn attachments ===
Furnival's Inn was founded before or during the reign of Henry IV and named after the Lords Furnival. During the 1820s the Inn was completely rebuilt. Noted tenants include Charles Dickens, who began to write The Pickwick Papers whilst living there. The Inn was demolished in 1897.

Thavie's Inn was the second-oldest Inn of Chancery, and was founded around 1349. It was sold in 1769. Lawyers from Thavie's Inn were the first to occupy the premises which became Inner Temple in the 1320s.

=== Gray's Inn attachments ===
Staple Inn dated from at least 1415, and was originally an inn where wool merchants stayed and haggled. In reference to this, the Inn's coat of arms contained a bale of wool. During the reign of Elizabeth I it was the largest of the Inns of Chancery, with 145 students and 69 permanent residents. The buildings survived the Great Fire of London and were rebuilt in the 17th century, and again in the 19th. The Inn was shut down and the building sold to the Prudential Assurance Company in 1884, and part of it is now used as the headquarters of the Institute of Actuaries.

Barnard's Inn, originally known as Mackworth's Inn after its owner, John Mackworth, was established in 1454 as an Inn of Chancery. A large Inn, Barnard's had 112 students a year during the reign of Elizabeth I, with 24 in permanent residence. When it was an institute of legal education, it enforced the odd practice of fining a student when he got something wrong: a halfpenny for a defective word, a farthing for a defective syllable and a penny for an improper word. Barnard's was under the supervision of Gray's Inn, who traditionally sent a Reader to the Inn every year, who was treated with great respect. Noted pupils included Sir John Holt, later a distinguished jurist. The Inn was badly damaged in the Gordon Riots after a rioter set fire to the distillery next door. In 1880 it was bought by the Worshipful Company of Mercers and used to house the Mercers' School.

== See also ==
- List of demolished buildings and structures in London

== Bibliography ==
- Baker, John (2008). "The Inn of the Outer Temple". Law Quarterly Review (124). Sweet & Maxwell. ISSN 0023-933X.
- Bellot, Hugh H. L. (1902). The Inner and Middle Temple legal, literary, and historic associations. Methuen & Co. OCLC 180158440.
- Douthwaite, William Ralph (1886). Gray's Inn, Its History & Associations. Reeves and Turner. OCLC 2578698.
- Loftie, W J (1895). The Inns of court and chancery. New York: Macmillan & co. OCLC 592845.
- Ringrose, Hyacinthe (1909). The Inns of court an historical description of the Inns of court and chancery of England. Oxford: R.L. Williams. OCLC 80561477.
- Steel, H. Spenden (1907). "Origin and History of English Inns of Chancery". The Virginia Law Register. 13 (8). Virginia Law Review: 585–593. doi:10.2307/1103274. ISSN 1547-1357. JSTOR 1103274.
- Watt, Francis; Dunbar Plunket Barton; Charles Benham (1928). The Story of the Inns of Court. Boston: Houghton Mifflin. OCLC 77565485.
- Webster, James C. (1911). "Inns of Court" . In Chisholm, Hugh (ed.). Encyclopædia Britannica. Vol. 14 (11th ed.). Cambridge University Press. pp. 584–587.
