= Furnival's Inn =

Inn of Chancery (demolished 1897)

Coordinates: 51.5182°N 0.1099°W

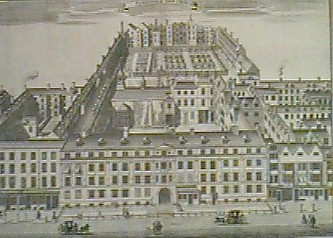
Early-18th-century engraving of Furnival's Inn by Sutton Nicholls

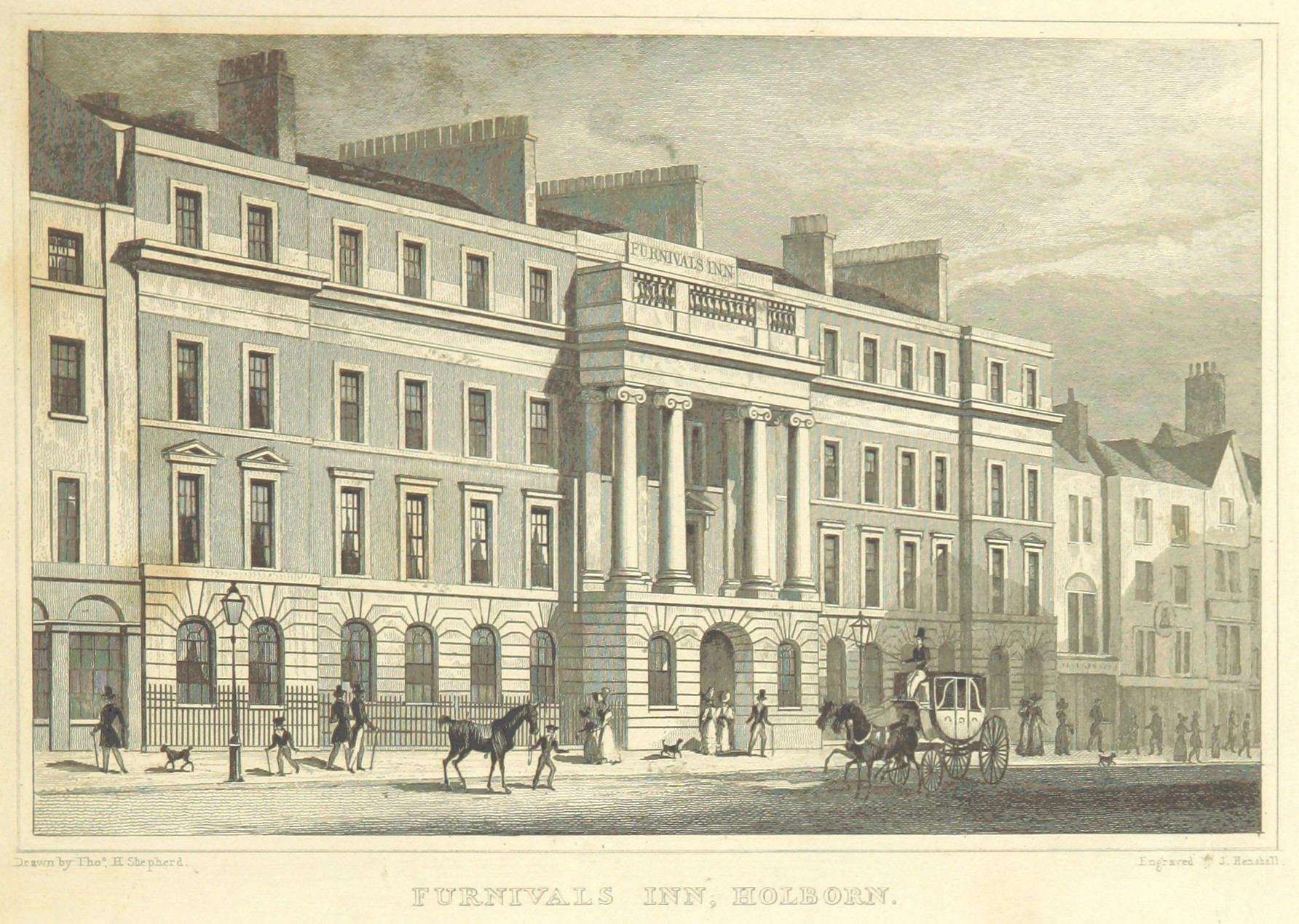
The rebuilt Furnival's Inn, as depicted by Shepherd in 1828

Furnival's Inn was an Inn of Chancery which formerly stood on the site of the present Holborn Bars building (the former Prudential Assurance Company building) in Holborn, London, England.

== History ==
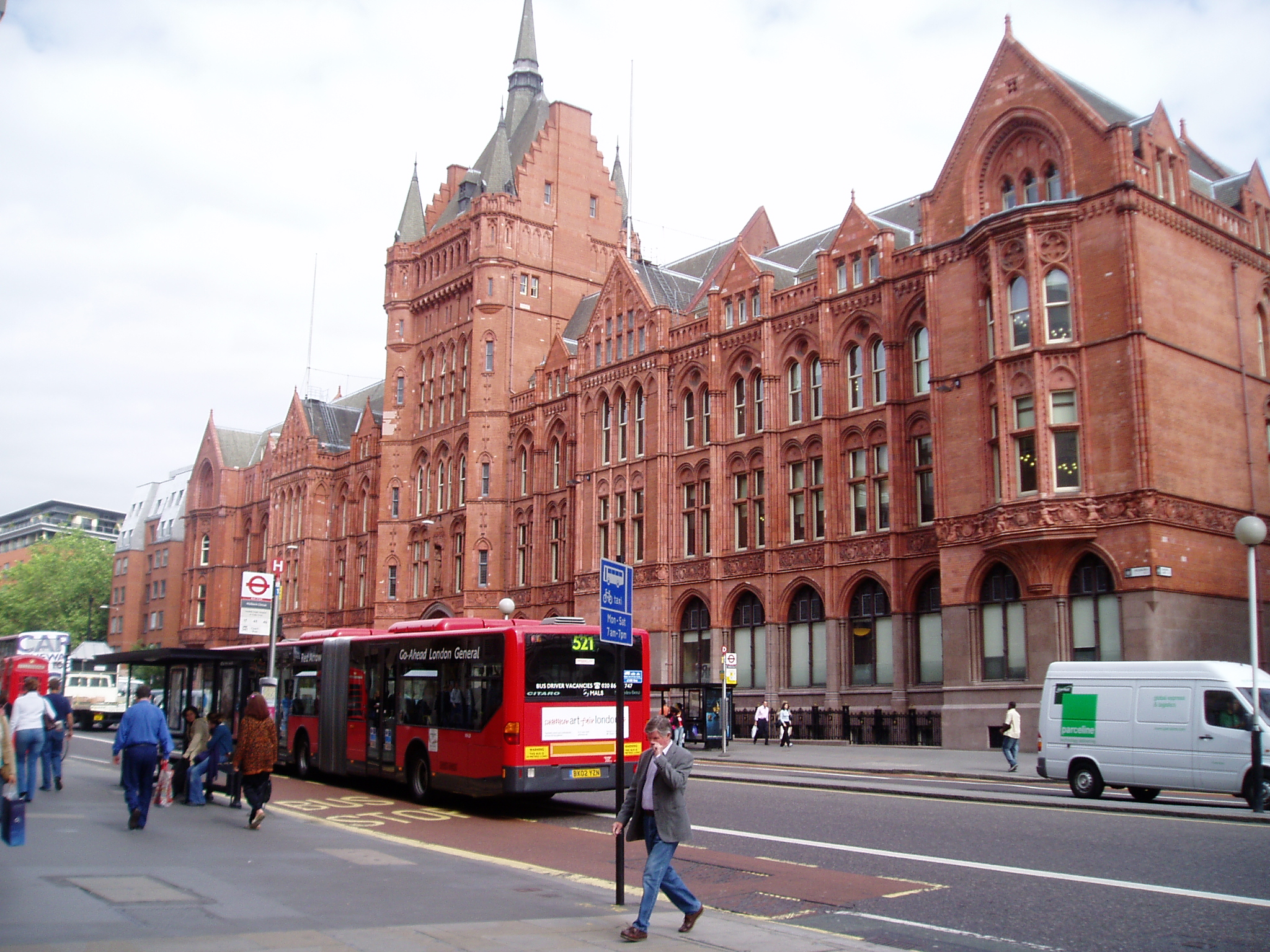
Holborn Bars – former site of Furnival's Inn, built in phases between 1885 and 1901

Furnival's Inn was founded about 1383 when William de Furnival, 4th Lord Furnival leased a boarding facility to Clerks of Chancery, who prepared writs for the king's courts, assisted by apprentices who, as such, received a preliminary legal training. By the 15th century the Inns of Chancery had become preparatory schools for students wishing to be called to the bar by the Inns of Court. In 1548 it was affiliated to Lincoln's Inn through a long-term lease. Sir Thomas More was Reader at the Inn from 1504 to 1507.

By the seventeenth century, the Inns of Chancery began to turn into societies for attorneys and solicitors; they became residences, offices and dining clubs. The greater part of the old Inn was taken down in Charles I's time, and a new building erected in its stead. Although it survived the Great Fire of London, the Inn, together with the other Inns of Chancery, ceased to exist in the 19th century. According to the Gentleman's Magazine of June 1818, "'Furnival's Inn Cellar' was a place well known to the professional gentlemen, where a good dinner may be had at a reasonable price." The Inn was dissolved as a society in 1817 when Lincoln's Inn did not renew its lease and the medieval building was demolished in 1818. The building was rebuilt as apartments by a new owner who retained the old name.

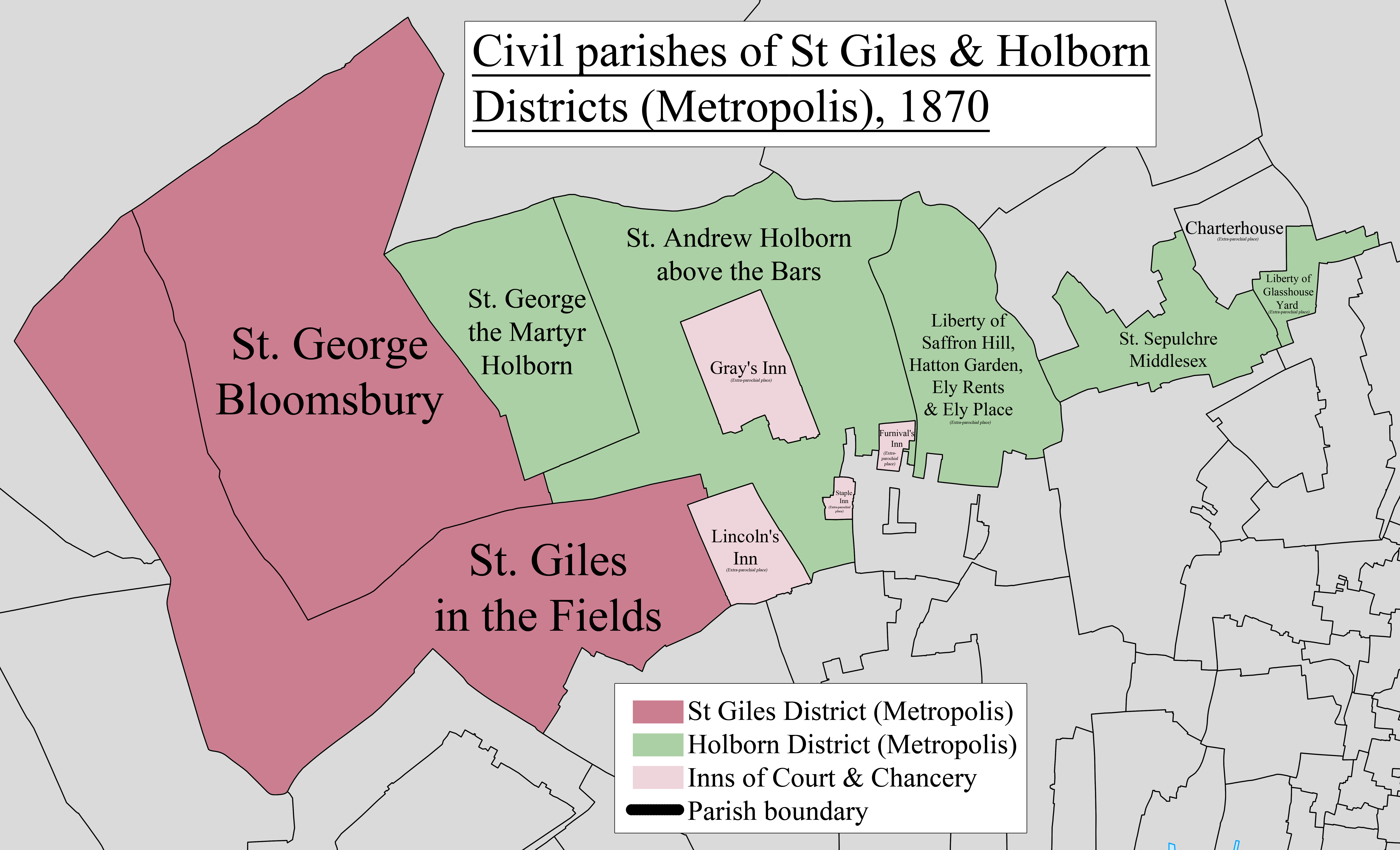
A map showing the boundaries of the Inn in 1870.

Charles Dickens rented rooms here between December 1834 and throughout the first year of his marriage, until 1837. He began the Pickwick Papers while a tenant there. The character John Westlock in Martin Chuzzlewit lives in Furnival's Inn, and describes it as

"...a shady, quiet place, echoing to the footsteps of the stragglers who have business there; and rather monotonous and gloomy on summer evenings. ... there are snug chambers in those Inns where the bachelors live, and, for the desolate fellows they pretend to be, it is quite surprising how well they get on".

Dickens also mentioned the Inn where Nicodemus Dumps walks “as far as Furnivals Inn” in “Sketches by Boz”, “The Bloomsbury Christening”.

J.M. Barrie lived in a set of chambers at No. 7 Furnival's Inn from 1888 to 1889. The site was redeveloped again, in 1879, as the headquarters of the Prudential Assurance. A plaque marks the site where Furnival's Inn stood.

== Governance ==
Furnival's Inn
- Civil parish
- Area
  - 1921: 1 acre (0.0040 km^{2})
- Population
  - 1921: 0
- History
  - Abolished: 31 March 1930
  - Succeeded by: Holborn

Furnival's Inn was an area for local government partly in the City of London and partly in Middlesex. It was an extra-parochial area and became a civil parish in 1858 within the Holborn Poor Law Union. The part within the City of London was transferred to St Andrew Holborn in 1900. The remaining parish was part of the Metropolitan Borough of Holborn from 1900 and was abolished on 31 March 1930 and merged with Holborn. It was unpopulated after the construction of Holborn Bars.

| Year | 1881 | 1891 | 1901 | 1911 | 1921 |
| Population | 121 | 121 | 0 | 0 | 0 |

== See also ==
- List of demolished buildings and structures in London

== Sources ==
- D. S. Bland, Early records of Furnival's Inn, 1957.
