= Edmund Weaver =

Edmund Weaver may refer to:

- Edmund Weaver (publisher), 17th-century draper and bookseller in London
- Edmund Weaver (MP) (1610–1672), English politician
- Edmund Weaver (astronomer) (1683–1748), English astronomer and land surveyor
