= Revels (Inns of Court) =

Seasonal entertainment for lawyers

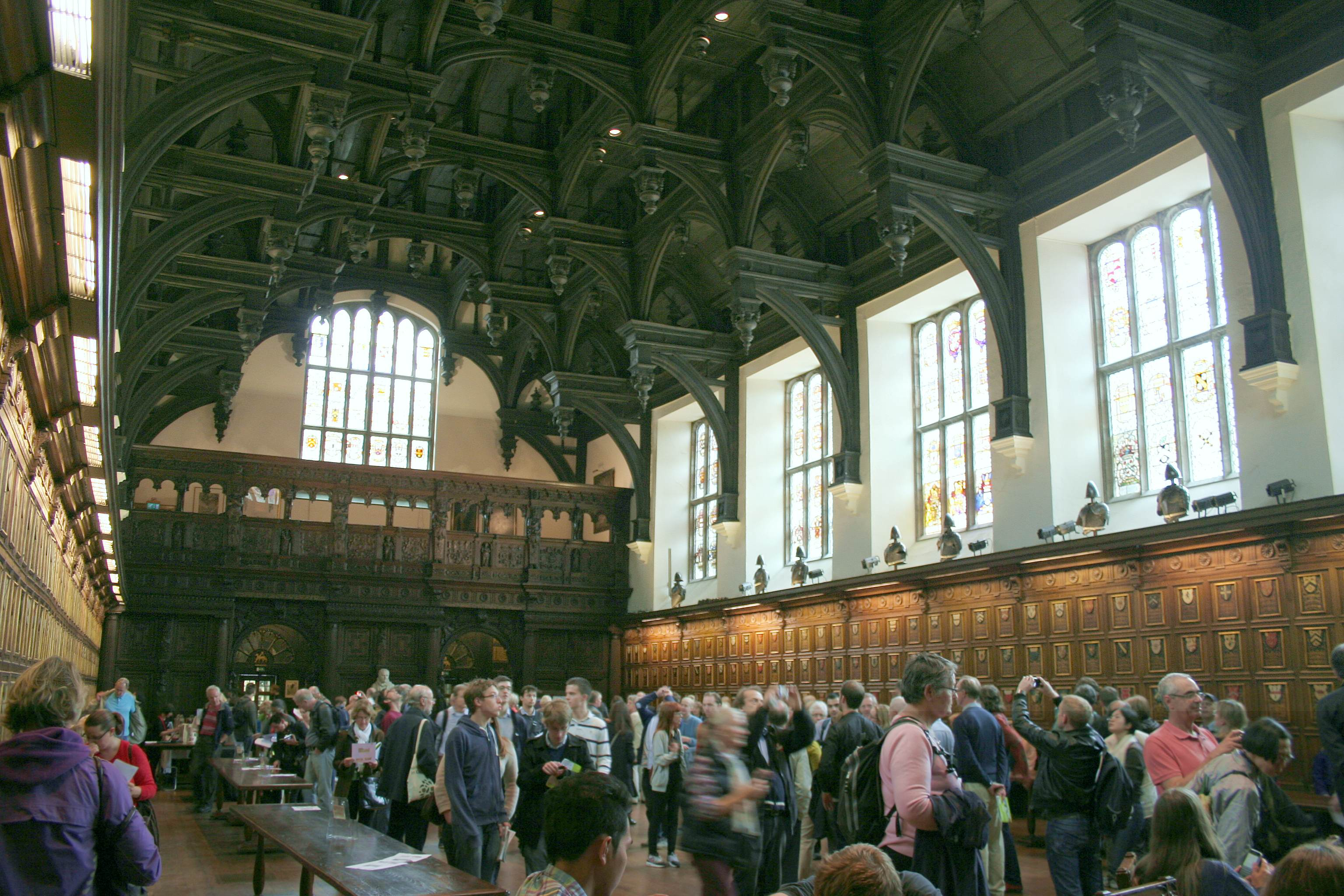
Middle Temple hall hosted revels entertainments

The revels were a traditional period of merrymaking and entertainment held at the Inns of Court, the professional associations, training centres and residences of barristers in London, England. The revels were held annually from the early 15th to the early 18th centuries and were an extension of a general nationwide period of entertainment running from All Saints' Eve (31 October) to Candlemas (2 February), though in some years they lasted as late as Lent. The inns elected a "prince" to lead the festivities and put on a sequence of elaborate entertainments and wild parties. The events included singing, dancing, feasting, the holding of mock trials and the performance of plays and masques. The revels played an important part in encouraging early English theatre and provided William Shakespeare with one of his most distinguished audiences in his early career. Several plays were written specifically for the revels and legal scenes in many plays from this era may have been written with this audience in mind. The revels declined in the 17th century and they last appear to have been held in 1733. The inns revived the revels in the mid 20th-century and they now comprise a seasonal offering of entertainment in the form of sketches, songs and jokes.

== Background ==
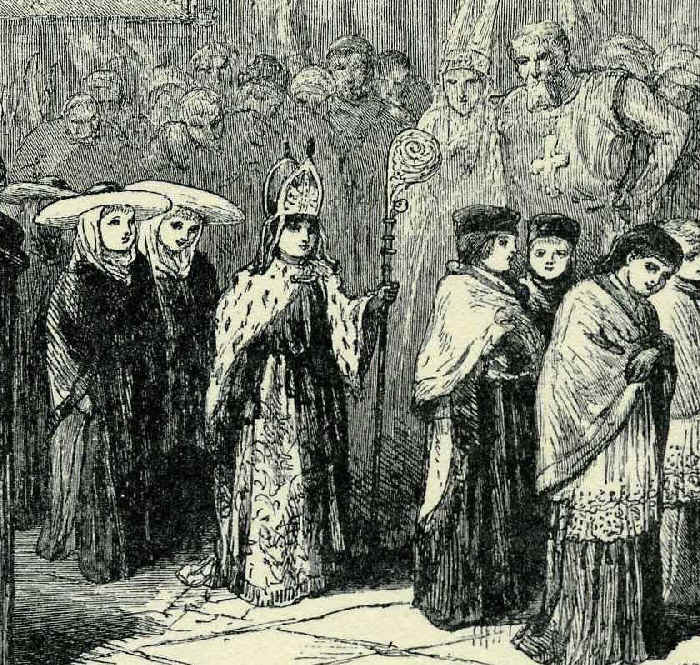
Depiction of a medieval boy bishop

The Inns of Court are a group of four professional associations for barristers in England and Wales. In medieval and renaissance times they also served as places of training, residences and entertainment for their members. The inns' members were largely students, poets, translators and the sons of gentry and the majority were below the age of 30. The inns maintained a varied social calendar for their members, with entertainments throughout the year centred on feast days.

The revels are named from the Latin rebellare meaning "to rebel" and refer to a period of entertainment centred on Christmas. In the medieval era there was a general nationwide period of revelry that lasted from All Saints' Eve (also known as All Hallows Eve or Halloween, 31 October) to Candlemas (2 February). This included actions taken around Christmas to upset the traditional order of things, such as the appointment of boy bishops. The inns are known to have taken part in these festivities since at least the 9th year of the reign of Henry VI (c. 1431) when Lincoln's Inn decreed four revel events on All Hallows Day, the feast day of St Erkenwald (30 April), Candlemas and Midsummers Day. This developed into a more regulated period of revels lasting from Christmas Eve to Candlemas, though there continued to be some variation with revels periods starting earlier or lasting as late as Lent.

== Description ==
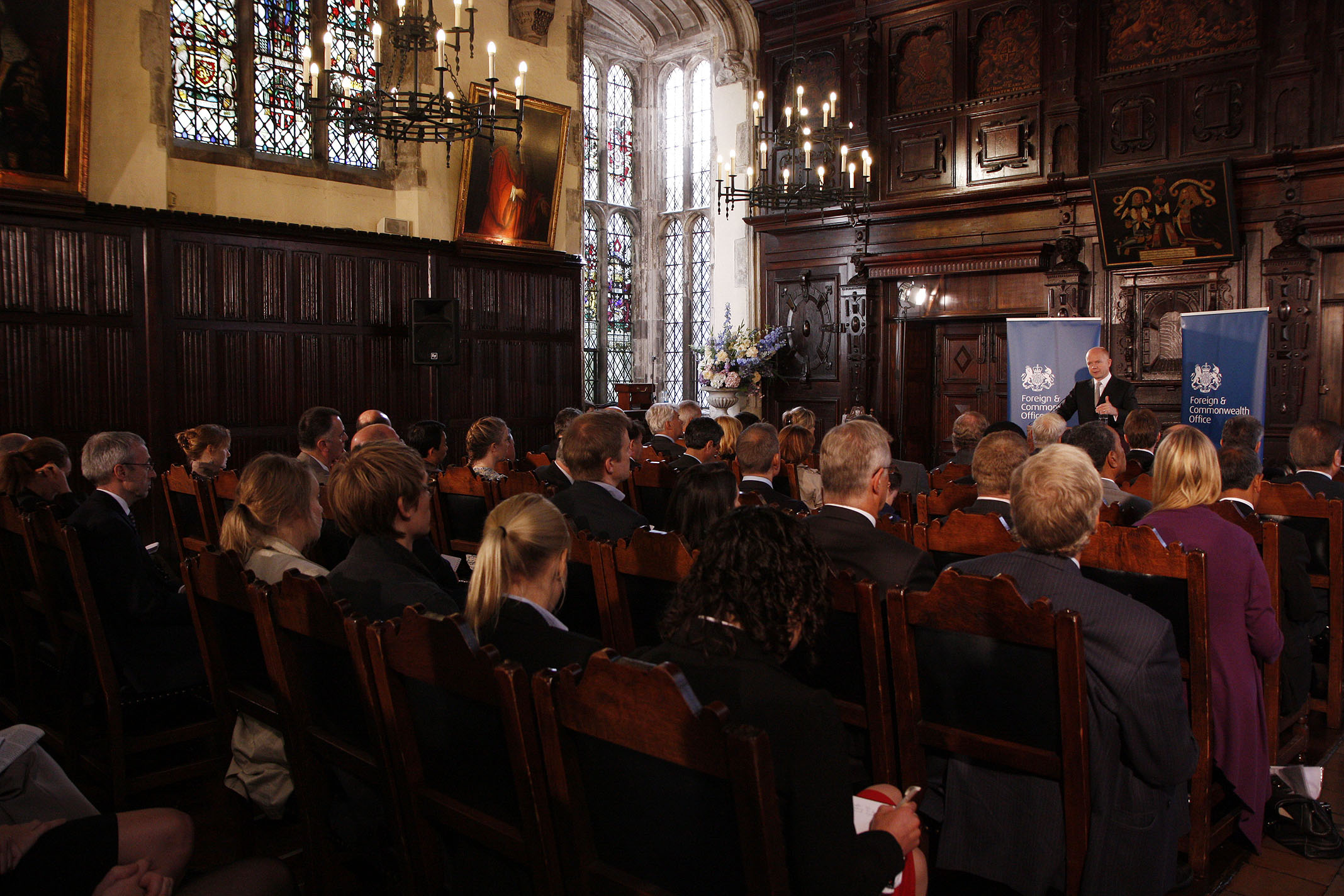
Interior of the medieval hall of Lincoln's Inn

Written records of the revels do not seem to have been kept, or else have been subsequently lost, however some accounts remain. It is known that the inns appointed "princes of misrule" to lead the revels at each institution. At the Inner Temple this man was known as the "Prince of the Sophie" (the Sophy being a term used to refer to the ruler of Persia at that time); at the Middle Temple it was the "Prince D'Amour" (French for "Prince of Love"); Lincoln's Inn had the "Prince of the Grange" and Gray's Inn selected a "Prince of Purpoole". The selection of the prince was not without controversy, at one time the poet John Davies, frustrated at not being named Prince D'Amour, entered the Middle Temple's dining hall and struck the man selected over the head with a club. He was disbarred for a period and the Prince was later suspended after breaking into some barrister's chambers. Sometimes important figures were selected, the Inner Temple in 1561 selected the Royal favourite Robert Dudley, 1st Earl of Leicester as the Prince of the Sophie, but also "Christmas Prince and Master of the Revels". Dudley's revels are said to have been particularly extravagant. At Gray's in 1594 the Prince took part in a grand enthronement procession from his lodgings to the inn's great hall, aping the custom of processions ahead of royal coronations. Dozens of the inn's members played the role of the traditional attendants at such processions.

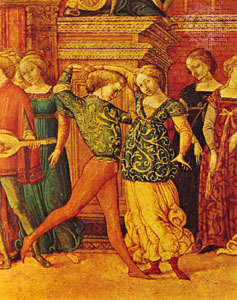
A 15th-century depiction of the galliard

In general the revels were regarded as a period of extravagant entertainment and wild partying, though the events generally followed a set traditional sequence. Members of the inn who refused to become involved in the events were fined as a punishment. The nature of the revels often varied depending on the rank of the member. The young students were noted to have taken part in energetic and intimate dances with women, such as the galliard, and exuberant singing whilst the more senior benchers had more formal, traditional dances and sang psalms. Other entertainments included feasts and mock trials. The revels attracted an audience of well-connected people of high rank. Elizabeth I attended one revels session at the Inner Temple where she noted the dancing ability of Christopher Hatton, whom she later appointed Lord Chancellor of England. Sir Walter Raleigh attended the Middle Temple revels in 1598, a record of these survives and a script from them was performed at the inn in 1998 by the Middle Temple as a celebration of the historic event.

=== Plays and masques ===
The entertainments at the revels often included plays, which came to be known as Inns of Court tragedies. The first such was Gorboduc (the first English-language play on an English subject) performed in January 1562 during Dudley's term as Prince at the Inner Temple; Jocasta and Gismund of Salerne were performed later that decade. The performances were usually put on by professional companies, who regarded the revels as a good opportunity to perform before an audience of distinguished personages. In some cases the members of the inns were involved with the production of the plays, often taking on acting parts. There was also some involvement in playwriting: Arthur Brooke was a member of the Inner Temple and wrote a masque (a short performance including music, acting and dancing), Beauty and Desire for the 1561–1562 revels and The Supposes was produced by Gray's Inn for 1566. William Shakespeare may have seen the latter as he adapted it for a subplot in The Taming of the Shrew. The Misfortunes of Arthur, by Thomas Hughes and performed at the 1588–1589 revels, is thought to be the only play to be both written and performed by members of an inn in the 16th century and by 1600 almost all plays at the inns were performed by professional companies. The 1634 masque The Triumph of Peace was the most expensive ever put on, costing £21,000.

It is thought that professional playwrights of this era wrote plays specifically with the revels' audience in mind and may have featured legal scenes in the hope of them being selected for a performance. The inns played a key role in providing venues and funding for performances and were a great encouragement to early British actors and playwrights. The close relationship between the companies and the inns is alluded to in Ben Jonson's Every Man out of His Humour, 1599: "the noblest nourceries [nurseries] of humanity, and liberty, in the kingdome: The Inns of Court".

The revels' audience, being gentlemen, were trained in fencing and dancing and were thought to be especially critical of actors who lacked these skills; performances were often interrupted by interjections from the audience. The students of the inns were regarded as being particularly rowdy and are known to have got into fights with actors from Oxford's Men in 1580 and the Earl of Berkeley's men in 1581. Despite this the plays and masques were regarded as the more respectable aspect of the revels. Elizabeth I attended a performance at Gray's Inn in 1565 and another in 1595 at which the Masque of Proteus was performed. On the latter occasion she returned the next night to present the Prince of Purpoole with diamonds and rubies. The Lincoln's Inn and Middle Temple performed a revels masque at the royal court to celebrate the wedding of Elizabeth Stuart to Frederick V of the Palatinate.

==== Shakespeare ====
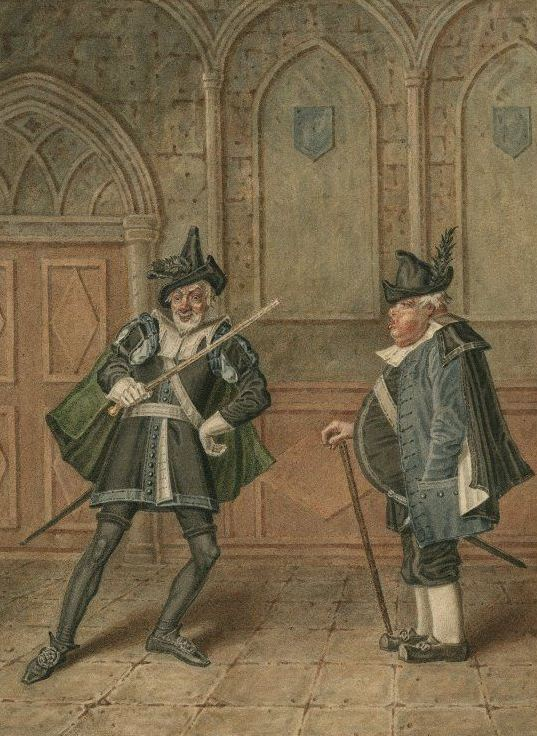
A 19th-century depiction of the Justices Shallow and Silence

Many of Shakespeare's plays allude to connections with the revels. Proteus, the hero of his The Two Gentlemen of Verona may have been taken from the inns' Masque of Proteus, the play's theme of friendship may have been inspired by the theme of the 1594 Gray's Inn revels (which centred on a Masque of Amity). The scene in The Taming of the Shrew (c. 1590–1592) showing the arrival of Lucentio at the university in Padua and a reminder from Tranio not to neglect his own pleasure whilst there may have been written by Shakespeare with an audience of law students in mind. In the same play the scene where the pedlar Christopher Sly temporarily gains the status of a lord may have been a reference to the temporary reigns of the inns' princes during the revels. In Henry IV, Part 2 (c. 1596-99) Shakespeare has a justice of the peace, Robert Shallow, recall his time at the revels where, together with his friends, "you had not four such swinge bucklers in the Inns of Court again; and again I say to you we knew where the bon robas [prostitutes] were and had the best of them at commandment". Shallow claims to have been nicknamed "Mad Shallow" for his behaviour at the revels, but his colleague, Justice Silence, recalls that he was actually known as "Lusty Shallow".

A performance of Shakespeare's The Comedy of Errors took place at the Gray's Inn revels on 28 December 1594 and is considered to be one of the best documented events of his life. The 1594–1595 Gray's Inn season was particularly elaborate as the previous three revels had been cancelled. The play formed part of a sequence of events focused on the Twelve Days of Christmas, though the revels themselves lasted until Shrove Tuesday (7 February 1595) with a performance of the Masque of Proteus before the queen.

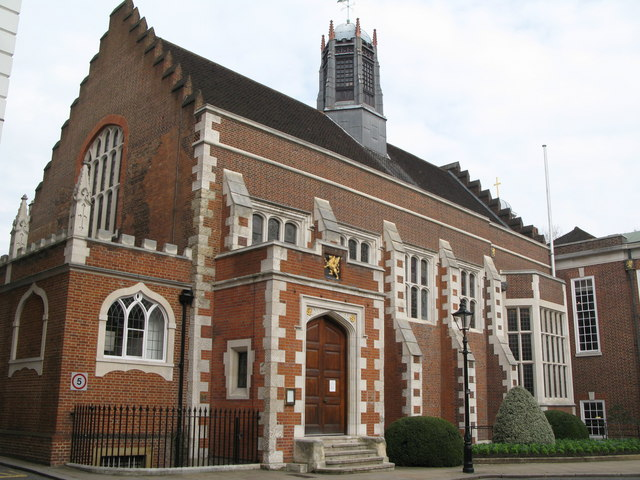
The Elizabethan hall of Gray's Inn

The 1594–1595 revels were themed around friendship; as part of this the inns exchanged members for the entertainments in formal ambassadorial-style exchanges. As such the audience for the 28 December performance was particularly distinguished. It included Henry Wriothesley, 3rd Earl of Southampton, the lawyer and playwright Thomas Hughes, the writer John Lyly, the philosopher and scientist Francis Bacon (who had contributed speeches to the 27 December entertainment) and Francis Davison (who wrote a masque for the revels that year). This was the most prestigious audience that Shakespeare's work had been performed for up to this time. It is thought that the Lord Chamberlain's Men performed the play on this occasion.

However, the night of 28 December did not proceed to plan. The hall was overcrowded and fights broke out over the best seats. The ambassador from the Inner Temple left, perhaps in a staged fit of pique and events to be held in his honour that night were cancelled. The amended programme included dances preceding the performance of the play. It was a difficult night for the acting company, their appearance was delayed for hours and the audience were disruptive. The event concluded early the next morning and was subsequently referred to as the "night of errors". On the following night of the revels a mock trial was held of a "sorceror" accused of causing the failure of the event.

Shakespeare's Twelfth Night was performed by the Queen's Men at the Middle Temple revels on 2 February 1602, at a time when one of his cousins was a student there. Troilus and Cressida (c. 1602) also appears to have been written for a performance at the inns.

== Decline, abandonment and modern revival ==
The quality of revels seems to have declined in the 17th century. In 1610 the entire "barre" (fellows) of Lincoln's Inn refused to dance during the revels, on an occasion when judges had been invited to witness the festivities. This embarrassed the inn, who at that time only exempted benchers from the requirement to dance. It is said that the revels at the Middle Temple were regarded as impressive during the reign of Charles I (1625–1649), though in 1638, Robert Brerewood remarked that the quality of dancing during the revels was worse than previously. Peter the Great of Russia attended a masque at the revels of 1697–1698 and was said to have witnessed "a riotous and revelling Christmas according to custom". The revels seem to have ceased soon afterwards and the last are thought to have been those of the Inner Temple in 1733.

The revels were revived at the inns in the mid-20th century by Master Hubert Monroe of the Middle Temple and have since provided seasonal entertainment in the form of sketches, songs and jokes.
