= The Misfortunes of Arthur =

The Misfortunes of Arthur, Uther Pendragon's son reduced into tragical notes is a play by the 16th-century English dramatist Thomas Hughes. Written in 1587, it was performed at Greenwich before Queen Elizabeth I on 28 February 1588. The play is based on the Arthurian legend, specifically the story of Mordred's treachery and King Arthur's death as told in Geoffrey of Monmouth's Historia Regum Britanniae.

Several of Hughes' fellow members at Gray's Inn participated in The Misfortunes of Arthur’s writing and production for the inn's revels. Nicholas Trotte provided the introduction, Francis Flower the choruses of Acts I and II, William Fulbecke wrote two speeches, while Francis Bacon, Christopher Yelverton, John Lancaster, and Flower oversaw the dumb shows. Lancaster and John Penruddocke directed the drama at Court. The play was greatly influenced by Seneca the Younger's tragedies, and was composed according to the Senecan model. The ghost of Gorlois, a duke slain by Uther Pendragon, opens the play with a speech reproducing passages spoken by Tantalus' ghost in Thyestes. All action occurs offstage and is related by a chorus, while a messenger announces the tragic events. W. J. Cunliffe demonstrated the influence of Seneca on Hughes, suggesting the play consists largely of translations of Seneca with occasional original lines.

The Misfortunes of Arthur was reprinted in John Payne Collier's supplement to Dodsley's Old Plays, and by Harvey Carson Grumline (Berlin, 1900), who points out that Hughes's source was Geoffrey of Monmouth's Historia Regum Britanniae rather than Thomas Malory's Le Morte d'Arthur.
