= Thomas Wight =

English bookseller and publisher (died c. 1608)

Thomas Wight (died ca. 1608) was a bookseller, publisher and draper in London. Wight published many important books, including many of the earliest law books in English.

== Career ==
Together with his father, the draper John Wight, he published seven editions of William Bourne's book A Regiment for the Sea, the first purely English navigational text.

By time Wight published Bourne's book, he was primarily a publisher, and became part of a monopoly for printing law books in 1599. He published many of the first printed English law books, including Fulbeck (1600), discussing study methods for law students, techniques for arguing a case, and suggestions for further reading. Pulton (1600), also published by Wight the same year, was the first book to attempt to summarise English criminal law. Fulbecke (1602) was one of the first books on international law. Saint German (1604) was first published in Latin in 1523, and attempts to describe English law through a dialogue between a churchman and a student of English common law. It ponders the nature of law, its religious and moral standards, and jurisdiction of Parliament. Manwood (1598) summarises the laws of the forest, known as Carta de Foresta; this was of key interest to English gentlemen, and went through numerous reprintings. Kitchin (1598) described manorial law, land law, and agrarian law.

Wight published copies of the "Yearbooks", notes by law students which were the earliest English legal reports dating back to the eleventh century.

Wight was also a prominent figure in the early discussions of copyright law.

Edmund Weaver, another famous London book publisher and bookseller, started as Wight's apprentice, and took over the business when Wight died.

== Other books published by Wight ==
- A direction, or preparatiue to the study of the lawe: wherein is shewed what things ought to be observed and used of them that are addicted to the study of the law and what on the contrary part ought to be eschued and avoyded. William Fulbecke, London: Printed by Thomas Wight, 1600.
- Le Tierce Part des Reportes del Eduuard Coke Lattourney General le Roigne, de Diuers Resolutions & Iudgements Donnes auec Graund Deliberation, per les Tresreuerend Iudges, & Sages de la Ley, de Cases & Matters en Ley, Queux ne Fueront Vnques Resolue, Ou Adiudges par Deuant, & les Reasons & Causes des Dits Resolutions & Iudgements, Durant les Tresheureux Regiment de Tresillustre & Renomes Roigne Elizabeth, le Fountaine de Tout Iustice, & la Vie de la Ley. Sir Edward Coke, London: In aedibus Thomae Wight, 1602.
- Littletons tenures in English. Lately perused and amended., Sir Thomas Littleton, Imprinted at London : By Thomas Wight, 1600.
- A booke of presidents. VVith additions of diuerse necessarie instrumentes, meete for all such as desire to learne, the manner and forme how to make euidences and instruments, &c. As in the table of this booke more plainely appeareth. Thomas Phayer, Imprinted at London : By [Adam Islip? for] Thomas Wight, 1604.
- A Parallele or Conference of the Civill Law, the Canon Law, and the Common Law of this Realme of England. Wherein the agreement and disagreement of these three Lawes . . . are opened and discussed [etc.]., William Fulbecke, Printed by Thomas Wight, London, 1601.
- Le court leete, et le court baron ... Ore nouelment imprimee, & per leauthor mesme corrigee, ouesque divers novel additions, come court depipowders, essoines, imparlance, view, actions, contracts, pleadings, maintenance, & divers auter matters, John Kitchin, Thomas Wight & Bonham Norton London 1598
- A Treatise and discourse of the Lawes of the Forest: Wherein is Declared Not Onely Those Lawes, As They Are Now In Force, But Also the Originall and Beginning of Forests: And What a Forest is In His Owne Proper Nature, And Wherein the Same Doth Differ From a Chase, A Park, Or a Warren, With All Such Things As Are Incident or Belonging Thereunto, With Their Severall Proper Tearmes of Art. As More at Large Doth Appeare in the Table in the Beginning of This Booke. Also a Treatise of the Purallee, Declaring What Purallee Is, How the Same First Began, What a Pourallee Man May Doe, How He May Hunt and Use His Owne Purallee, How Far He May Pursue and Follow After His Chase, Together With the Lymits and Boundes, Aswell of the Forrest, As the Pourallee. Collected, and Gathered Together, Aswell Out of the Common Lawes and Statutes of This Land, As Also Out of Sundrie Learned Ancient Authors, And Out of the Assises and Iters of Pickering and Lancaster., John Manwood, London: Printed by Thomas Wight and Bonham Norton, 1598.
- The Lives of the Noble Grecians and Romaines. Compared Together by that Grave Learned Philosopher and Historiographer, Plutarke of Charones. Translated Out of the Greek into French by Iames Amiot, Abbot of Bellozane, Bishop of Auxerre, One of the King's Privie Counsell, and Great Amner of France, With the Lives of Hannibal and of Scipio African. Translated. out of Latine into French by Charles de l'Esclvse, and Out of the French into English by Sir Thomas North Knight. Hereunto are Also Added the Lives of Epaminondas, of Philip of Macedon, of Dionysius the Elder, Tyrant of Sicilia, of Augustus Cæsar, of Plutarke, and of Seneca: with the Lives of Nine Other Excellent Chiefetaines of Warre:Collected out of Æmylius Probus, by S G S and Englished by the Aforesaid Translator., Plutarch, London: Richard Field for Thomas Wight, 1603.
- The Pandectes of the Law of Nations: Contayning Severall Discourses of the Questions, Points, and Matters of Law, Wherein the Nations of the World Doe Consent and Accord. Giving Great Light to the Understanding and Opening of the Principall Objects, Questions, Rules, and Cases of the Civill Law, and Common Law of This Realme of England. William Fulbecke London: Thomas Wight, 1602
- The workes of our antient and learned English poet, Geffrey Chavcer, newly printed. Geoffrey Chaucer London, : Printed by Adam Islip, at the charges of Thomas Wight, Anno 1598.
- A Book of the Arte and Manner How to Plant and Graffe All Sorts of Trees. . . ., Leonard Mascall London: Thomas Wight, 1592.
- Tractatus de legibus et consuetudinibus regni Angliae, tempore Regis Henrici secundi compositus, Ranulphus de Glanvilla, [bound with] Christopher St. Germain's Dialogus de fundamentis Legun Angliae et de conscientia. [N. p.]: Thomas Wight, 1604
- Les commentaries, ou, Reportes de Edmund Plowden : un apprentice de le common ley, de diuers cases esteant matters en ley, & de les arguments sur yceux, en les temps des raigns le roy Ed. le Size, le roign Mary, le roy & roign Ph. & Mary, & le roigne Elizabeth. [1548–1579] : Ouesque vn table perfect des choses notables contenus en ycel compose per William Fletewood, Edmund Plowden, London : Thomas Wight, 1599.
- The dialogue in English, betweene a Doctor of Diuinitie, and a student in the lawes of England: newly corrected and imprinted, with new additions, Christopher St. Germain, At London : Printed by [Adam Islip for] Thomas Wight, and Bonham Norton, 1598
- A learned commendation of the politique lawes of England: wherein, by most pithie reasons and euident demonstrations, they are plainelye proued farre to excel, as well the ciuil lawes of the Empire, as also all other lawes of the world, with a large discourse of the difference between the two gouernments of kingdomes, whereof the one is onely regall, and the other consisteth of regall and politique administration conioyned. Written in Latine by the learned and right honourable master Fortescue Knight, John Fortescue ... And translated into English by Robert Mulcaster [De laudibus legum Angliae. English and Latin] London : Printed by Thomas Wight, and Bonham Norton, 1599
- Foure bookes of husbandrie, collected by M. Conradus Heresbachius, councellour to the high and mightie prince, the Duke of Cleue: containing the whole art and trade of husbandry, gardening, graffing, and planting, with the antiquitie, and commendation thereof. Newly Englished, and increased by Barnabe Googe, Esquire, Conrad Heresbach, [Rei rusticae libri quatuor. English] London : Printed by T. Este, for Thomas Wight, 1596
- The second part of Symboleography, newly corrected and amended, and very much enlarged in all the foure seuerall treatises. 1. Of fines and concordes. 2. Of common recoueries. 3. Of offences and indictments. 4. Of compromises and arbitrements. Wereunto is annexed another treatise of equitie, the iurisdiction, and proceedings of the high Court of Chauncerye: of supplications, bils, and aunsweres, and of certaine writs and commissions issuing thence, and there also retornable: likewise much augmented with diuers presidents, very necessary for the same purpose, beginning at the 144. section, and continuing to the end of bils and aunsweres. Hereunto is also added a table for the more easy and readie finding of the matters herein contayned: the new additions hauing therein this marke * set before them [Symbolaeographia. Part 2], William West, fl. At London : Printed by Thomas Wight, Anno Do. 1601
- An Abstract of all the penall Statutes which be generall, in force and use: Wherein is conteined the effect of all those Statutes, which do threaten to the offenders thereof, the losse of life, member . . . or other punishment [etc.], Fardinando Pulton, Printed by Thomas Wight [etc.] London 1600

=== Yearbooks ===
- Les Reports de Les Cases Conteinus in les Ans Vint Primer, et Apres in Temps del Roy Henry Le Siz: Communement Appelle, The Second Part of Henry the Sixt, Nouelment Reuiew & Correge in Diuers Lieux. London: In Aedibus Thomae Wight, 1601.
- Syntomotaxia: Del Second Part Del Roy Henrie le Sixt, Per Quel Facilment Cy Troueront Soubs Apt Titles, Touts Choses Conteinus en le Dit Liuer. London: Printed by Thomas Wight, 1601.

== See also ==
- Worshipful Company of Drapers
