= Inner Temple =

English legal professional body

The Honourable Society of the Inner Temple
- Arms: Azure a pegasus salient argent; its association with the Inner Temple goes back to Robert Dudley and the revels of 1561.

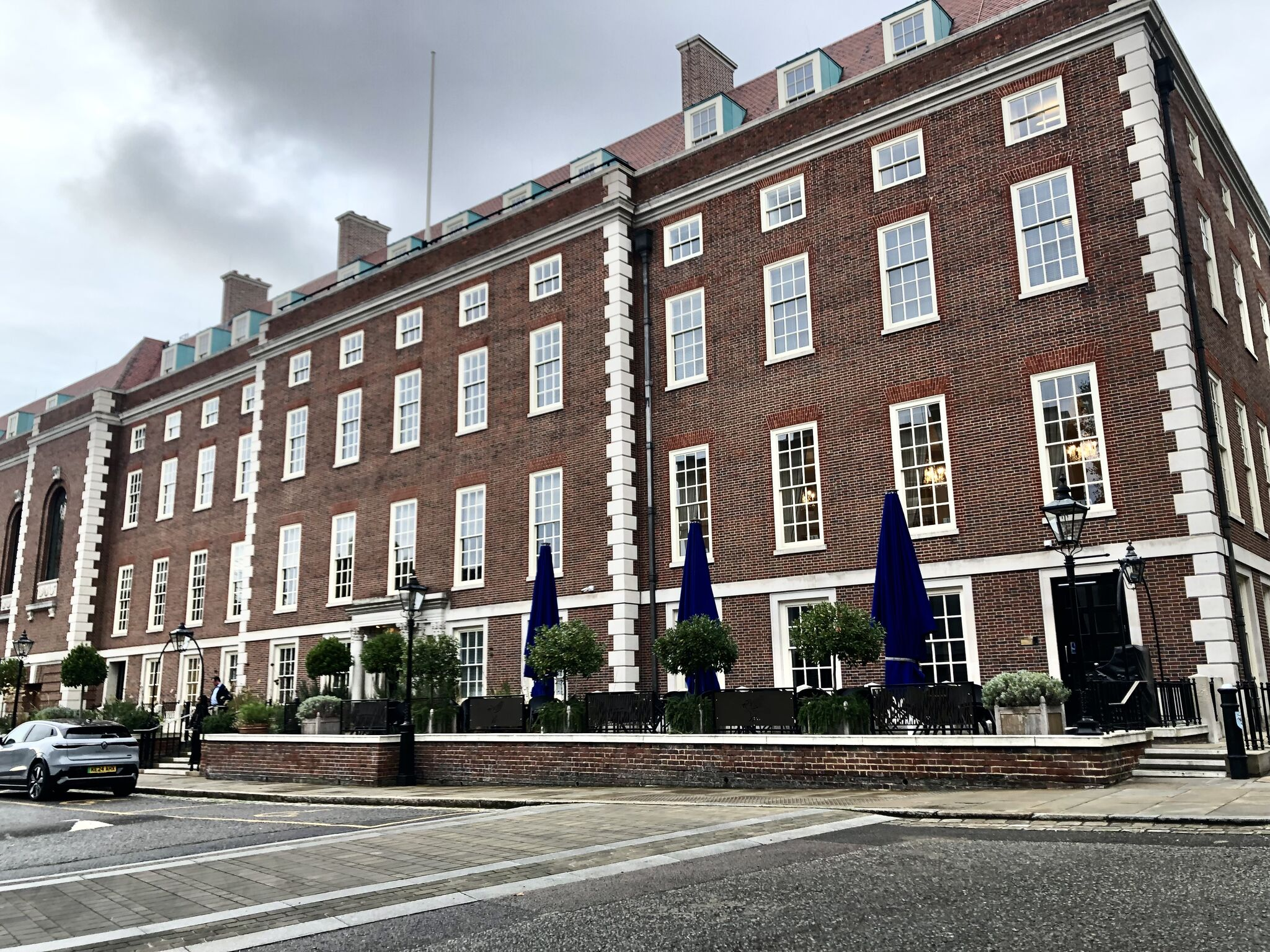
- Treasury Building, Inner Temple's Main Building
- Formation: c. 1388
- Type: Inn of Court
- Legal status: Unincorporated association and liberty
- Purpose: Professional association for barristers and judges
- Headquarters: Temple, London
- Location: City of London, United Kingdom
- Coordinates: 51.5127°N 0.1097°W
- Members: c. 8,000
- Treasurer: Sir Robert Francis KC (2023)
- Main organ: Parliament (Governing Council)
- Affiliations: Bar Council of England and Wales
- Website: www.innertemple.org.uk
- Remarks: One of the four Inns of Court

The Honourable Society of the Inner Temple, commonly known as the Inner Temple, is one of the four Inns of Court and is a professional association for barristers and judges. To be called to the Bar and practice as a barrister in England and Wales, a person must belong to one of these Inns. It is located in the wider Temple area, near the Royal Courts of Justice, and within the City of London. As a liberty, it functions largely as an independent local government authority.

The Inn is a professional body that provides legal training, selection, and regulation for members. It is ruled by a governing council called "Parliament", made up of the Masters of the Bench (or "Benchers"), and led by the Treasurer, who is elected to serve a one-year term. The Temple takes its name from the Knights Templar, who originally (until their abolition in 1312) leased the land to the Temple's inhabitants (Templars). The Inner Temple was a distinct society from at least 1388, although as with all the Inns of Court its precise date of founding is not known. After a disrupted early period (during which the Temple was almost entirely destroyed in the Peasants' Revolt) it flourished, becoming the second-largest Inn during the Elizabethan period (after Gray's Inn).

The Inner Temple expanded during the reigns of James I and Charles I, with 1,700 students admitted between 1600 and 1640. The First English Civil War's outbreak led to a complete suspension of legal education, with the Inns close to being shut down for almost four years. Following the English Restoration the Inner Templars welcomed Charles II back to London personally with a lavish banquet.

After a period of slow decline in the 18th century, the following 100 years saw a restoration of the Temple's fortunes, with buildings constructed or restored, such as the Hall and the Library. Much of this work was destroyed during The Blitz, when the Hall, Temple, Temple Church, and many sets of barristers' chambers were devastated. Rebuilding was completed in 1959, and today the Inner Temple is an active Inn of Court with over 8,000 members.

== Role ==
The Inner Temple is one of the four Inns of Court, along with Gray's Inn, Lincoln's Inn, and the Middle Temple. The Inns are responsible for training, regulating, and selecting barristers within England and Wales, and are the only bodies allowed to call a barrister to the Bar and allow him or her to practice.

The Inner Temple is an independent, unincorporated organisation, and works as a trust. It has approximately 8,000 members and around 450 apply to join per year. Although the Inn was previously a disciplinary and teaching body, these functions are now shared between the four Inns, with the Bar Standards Board (a division of the General Council of the Bar) acting as a disciplinary body and the Inns of Court and Bar Educational Trust providing education.

== History ==
=== The Knights Templar and the founding of the Inner Temple ===
The history of the Inner Temple begins in the early years of the reign of Henry II (1154–1189), when the contingent of Knights Templar in London moved from the Old Temple in Holborn to a new location on the banks of the River Thames, stretching from Fleet Street to what is now Essex House. The original Temple covered much of what is now the northern part of Chancery Lane (originally New Street), which the Knights created to provide access to their new buildings. The old Temple eventually became the London palace of the Bishop of Lincoln. After the Reformation it became the home of the Earl of Southampton, and the location is now named Southampton Buildings. The first group of lawyers came to live here during the 13th century, although as legal advisers to the Knights rather than as a society. The Knights fell out of favour, and the order was dissolved in 1312, with the land seized by the king and later granted to the Knights Hospitaller. The Hospitallers probably did not live on the property, but rather used it as a source of revenue through rent. The secular, common law lawyers migrated to the hamlet of Holborn, as it was easy to get to the law courts at Westminster Hall and was just outside the City.

Two groups occupied the Hospitaller land, and became known as the "inner inn" (occupying the consecrated buildings near the centre of the Temple) and the "middle inn" (occupying the unconsecrated buildings between the "inner inn" and the Outer Temple). These became the Inner Temple and the Middle Temple, and were distinct societies by 1388, when they are mentioned in a year book. The Hospitallers leased the land to the Inner Temple for £10 a year, with students coming from Thavie's Inn to study there.

=== Early years ===
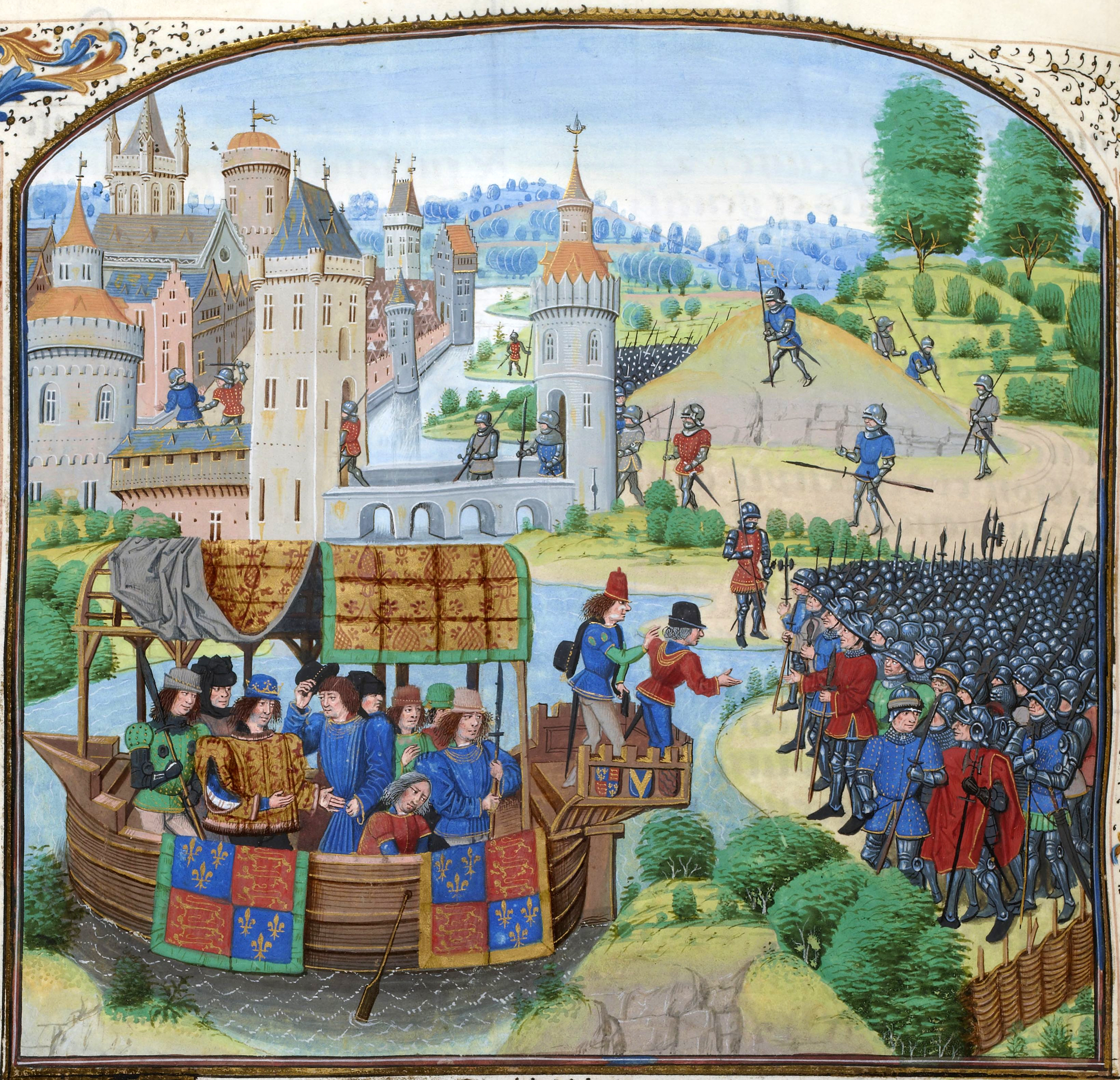
An image from the Peasants' Revolt of 1381, during which the Inner Temple was largely destroyed

There are few records of the Inner Temple from the 14th and 15th centuries—indeed, from all the societies, although Lincoln's Inn's records stretch back to 1422. The Temple was sacked by Wat Tyler and his rebels during the Peasants' Revolt in 1381, with buildings pulled down and records destroyed. John Stow wrote that, after breaking into Fleet Prison, the rebels:

went to the Temple to destroy it, and plucked down the houses, tooke off the tyles of the other buildings left; went to the churche, tooke out all the bookes and remembrances that were m the hatches of the prentices of the law, carried them into the high street, and there burnt them. This house they spoyled for wrathe they bare to the prior of St. John's, unto whom it belonged, and, after a number of them had sacked this Temple, what with labour and what with wine being overcome, they lay down under the walls and housing, and were slain like swyne, one of them killing another for old grudge and hatred, and others also made quick dispatch of them. A number of them that burnt the Temple went from thence to the Savoy, destroying in their way all the houses that belonged to the Hospital of St. John.

John Baker thinks that the inhabitants took the opportunity to rebuild much of the Temple, and that this was when the Temple's Hall was built, since it contained 14th century roofing that would not have been available to the Knights Templar. The Inns of Court were similarly attacked in Jack Cade's rebellion, although there are no specific records showing damage to the Inner Temple.

The Hospitallers' properties were confiscated and given to Henry VIII by a statute of 1539/40. The Benchers of the Inn then attorned to the crown and were tenants until 1608. Following a Scotsman's request to purchase the land, the Inner and Middle Temples appealed to James I, who granted the land to a group of noted lawyers and Benchers, including Henry Montague and Sir Julius Caesar, and to "their heirs and assignees for ever" on the condition that the Inner and Middle Temples each paid him £10 a year.

=== Elizabethan age ===
The Elizabethan age saw a large amount of rebuilding and beautification within the Temple, and with over 100 sets of chambers it was the second largest Inn (after Gray's Inn), with 155 residential students reported in 1574.

In winter 1561, the Inner Temple was the scene of an extraordinary set of revels that celebrated the raising of Robert Dudley as the Temple's "Christmas Prince", a role he was granted in gratitude for his intervention in a dispute with the Middle Temple over Lyon's Inn, one of the Inns of Chancery that had historically been tied to the Inner Temple. Dudley's influence swayed Elizabeth into asking Nicholas Bacon to rule in favour of the Inner Temple, and in gratitude the Parliament and Governors swore never to take a case against Dudley and to offer him their legal services whenever required.

This pledge was always honoured, and in 1576 the Inner Temple Parliament referred to Dudley as the "chief governor of this House". The play was partially documented by Gerard Legh in his Accedens of Armory, a book of heraldry woodcuts, which described Dudley's role as Prince Pallaphilos, the lieutenant of Athena and Patron of the Order of the Pegasus.

=== Seventeenth century ===
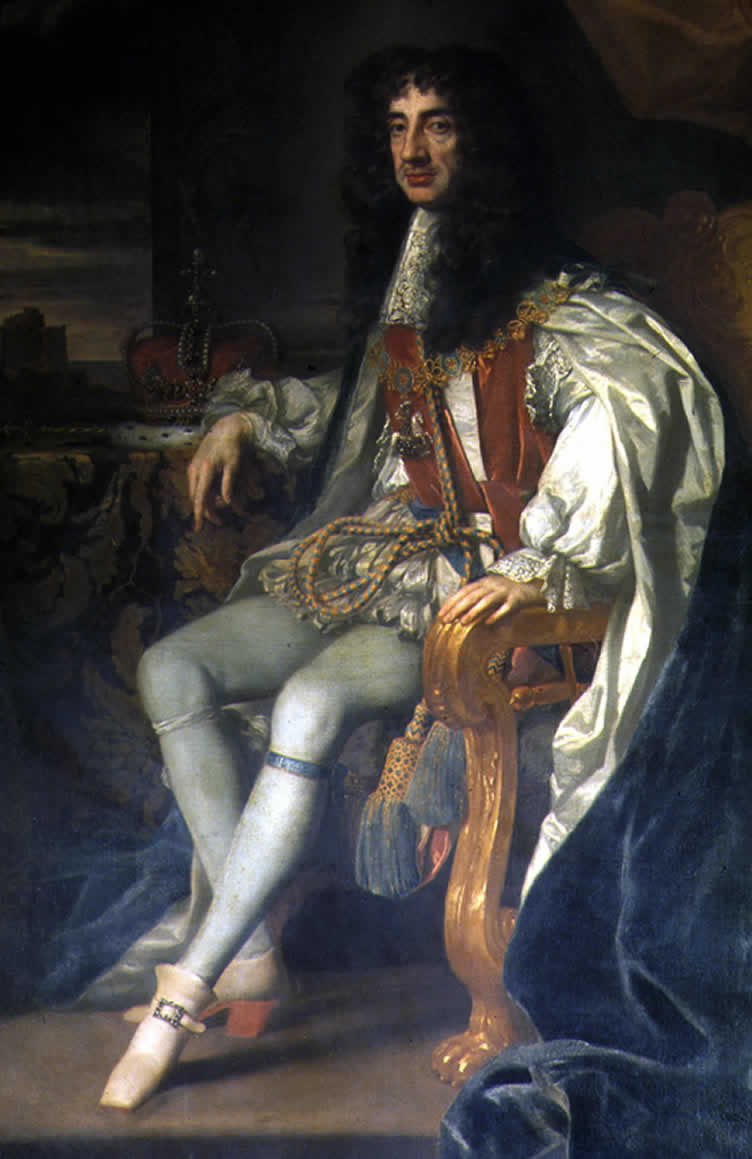
Charles II, whom the Inner Templars welcomed back to London after the English Restoration

The Inner Temple continued to expand during the reigns of James I and Charles I, with 1,700 students admitted to the Inn between 1600 and 1640. The outbreak of the First English Civil War led to a complete suspension of legal education, with the Inns almost shut down for nearly four years; the Inns "suffered a mortal collapse". Nothing was done to adapt the old system of legal education, which was declining anyway, to the new climate of internal war. After the end of the Civil War, the old system was not restored; Readers refused to read and both barristers and Benchers refused to follow the internal regulations. The last reading at Inner Temple was made in 1678.

Following the English Restoration, the Inner Temple welcomed Charles II back to London with a lavish banquet on 15 August 1661. The banquet was hosted by Sir Heneage Finch, the Speaker of the House of Commons and was attended by the King, four Dukes including the Duke of York, fourteen Earls of England, Scotland and Ireland, 6 Lords and the Chief Justice of the Common Pleas. The group proceeded from Whitehall on the King's barge, landed at the Temple and walked through the Temple Garden surrounded by all the Benchers, barristers and servants of the Temple, fifty of whom brought a lavish feast for the revellers. At the start of the next legal term, two Dukes including the Duke of York, two Earls and two Lords were admitted as members, and the Duke of York was called to the Bar and made an honorary Bencher.

During the rule of the House of Stuart, much was done by the Court of Star Chamber to enforce religious edicts against Catholicism within the Inner Temple. An order was sent directly to the Benchers proclaiming that no "pson eyther convented or suspected for papistrye shulde be called eyther to the benche or to the barre", and at the same time Benchers were selected specifically because of their Protestant beliefs, with popular and successful Catholics held back.

This period also features an example of the independent standing of the Temple; in 1668 the Lord Mayor of London attempted to enter the Temple with his sword, something that was his right in the City but not permitted within the Temple. The students took his sword and forced him to spend the night in a set of chambers; when he escaped and tried to return, they called the Trained Bands. The Mayor complained to the King, who heard the case on 7 April 1669 and decided to allow it to be determined by law rather than by his royal privilege; the lawyers returned to the principle that the Temple could set its own internal rules on the right to carry swords.

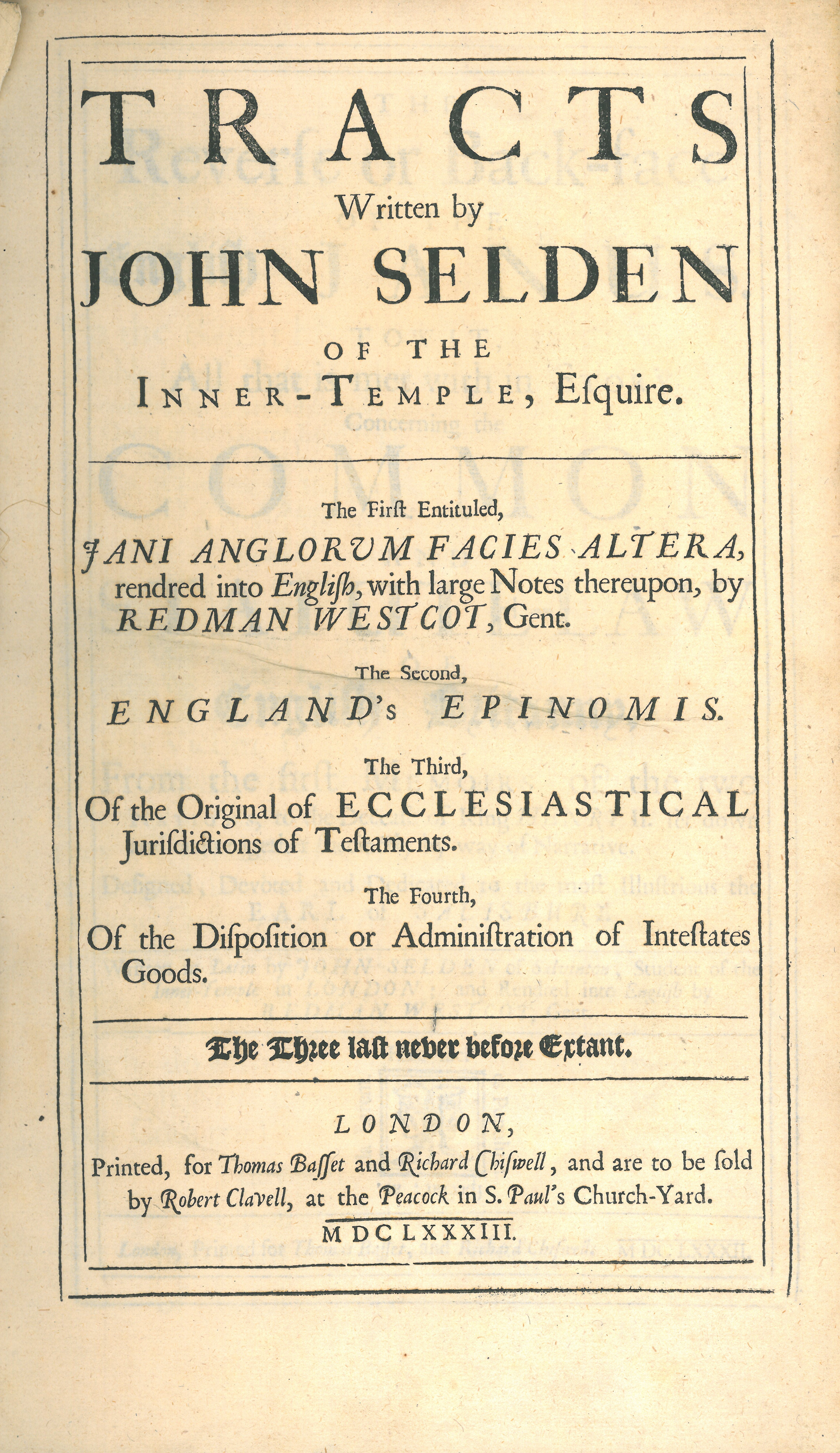
Tracts (1683) by John Selden, distinguished Inner Temple jurist

Much of the Inn was destroyed in the Great Fire of London in 1666, and extensive damage was done in other fires in 1677 and 1678. One of these fires destroyed Caesar's Buildings, on Middle Temple Lane where Lamb Buildings now stand, and the site was purchased by Middle Temple from Inner Temple, which needed the proceeds to repair or rebuild other buildings.

=== Eighteenth century to the present ===
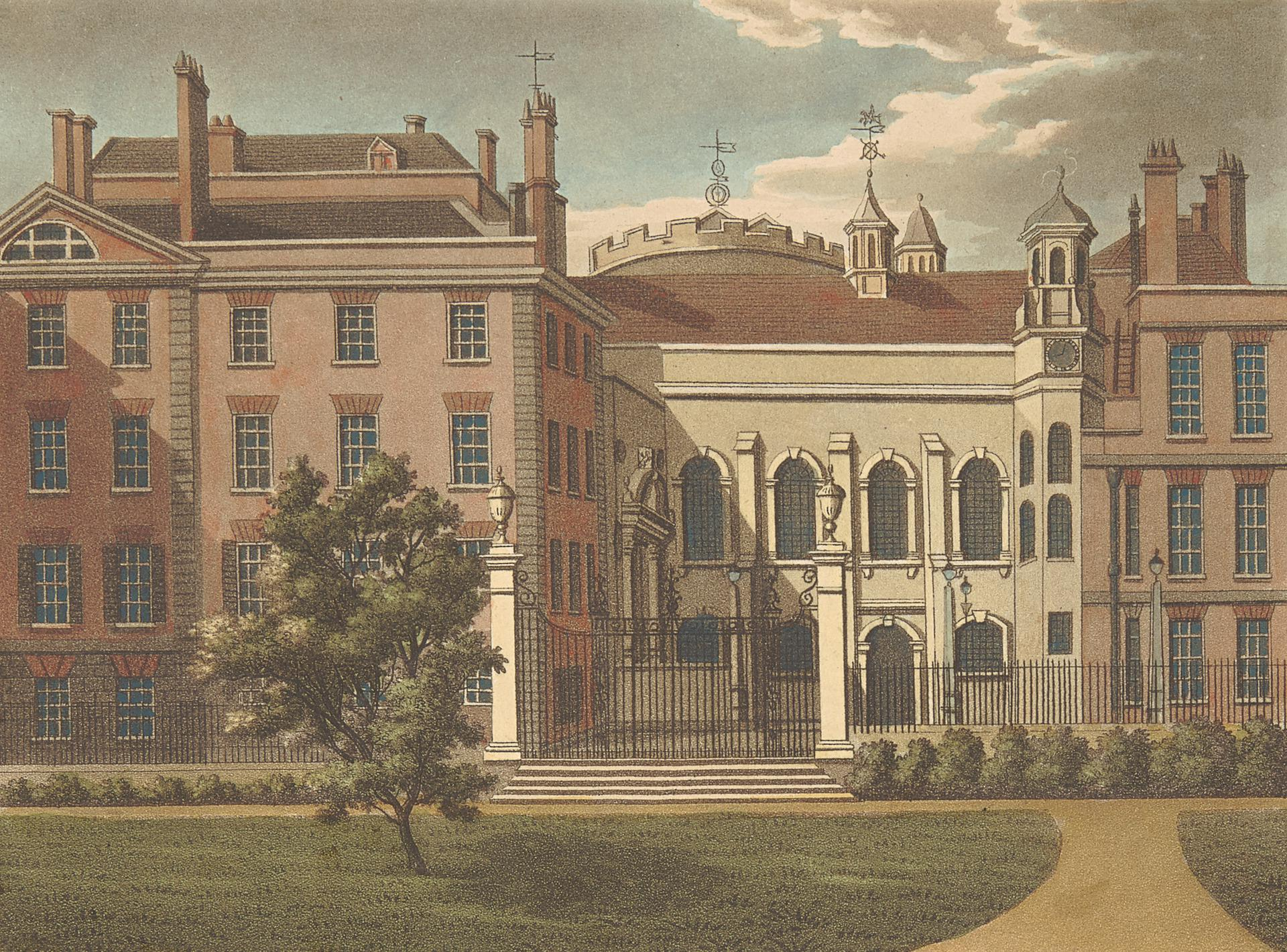
Inner Temple(1800) by Samuel Ireland

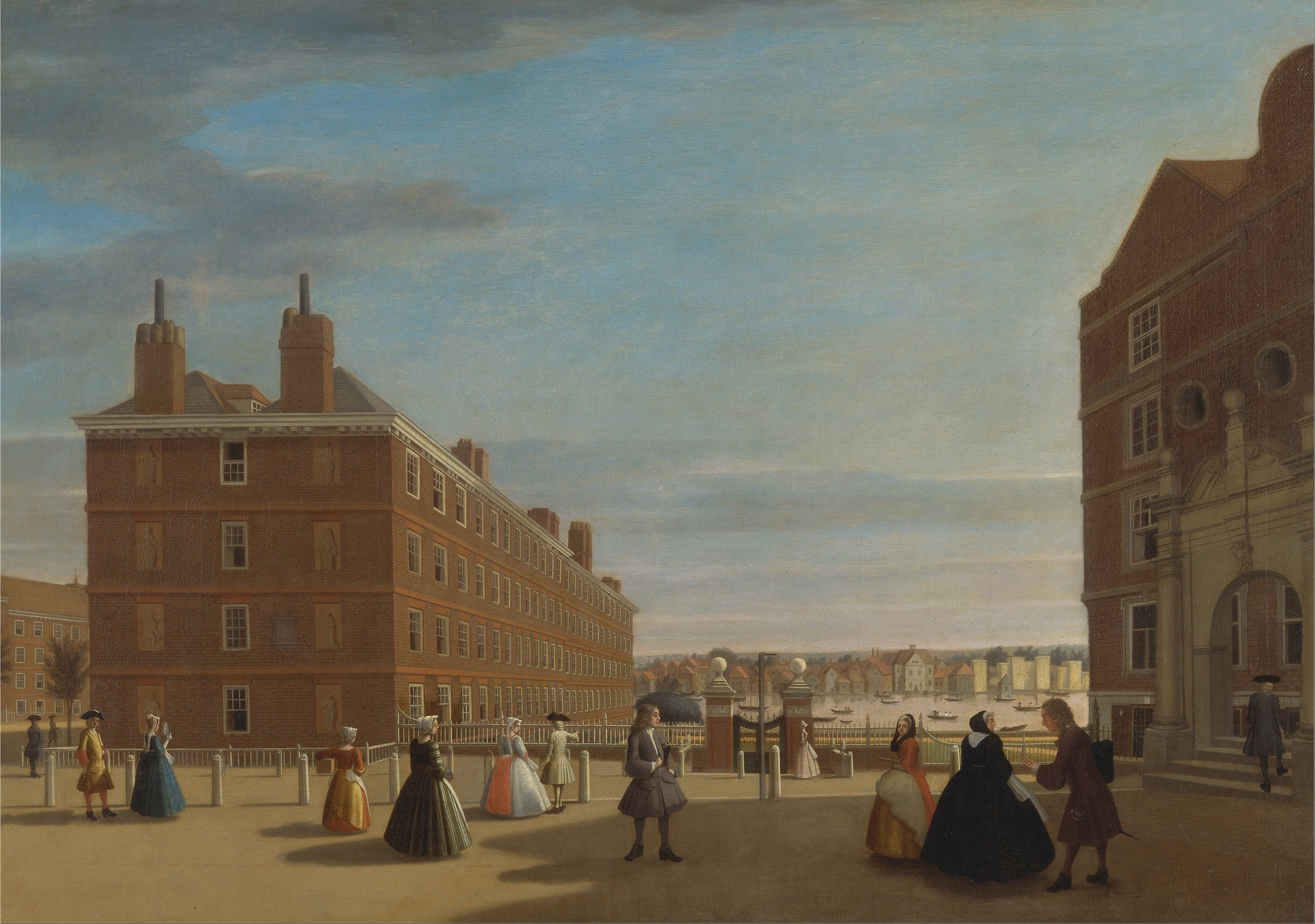
The Paper Buildings, Inner Temple (c 1725) artist unknown

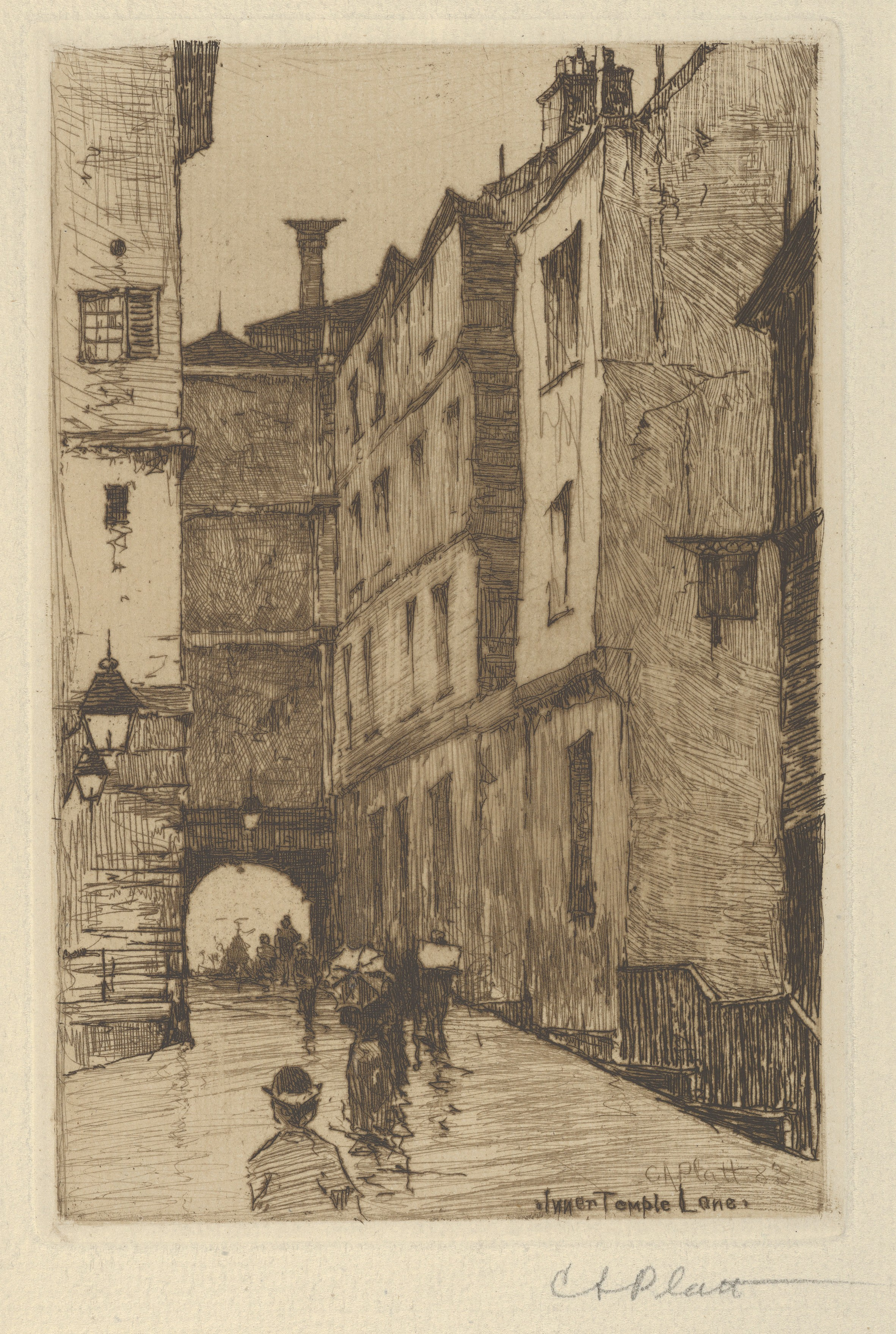
Sketch by Charles A. Platt 1883 of Middle Temple Lane (Inner Temple buildings on the right).

The 18th century was a period of relative stability, with an element of decline. The Benchers of the time were described as "opposed to all modern fashions, including new-fangled comforts", with the Inn's buildings deteriorating. Much of the Temple was rebuilt during the 19th century, most noticeably the Hall and Library, although fever and disease continued as a result of the Inn's outdated systems; the same water was used both for drinking and for flushing the toilet, for example.

In 1922 the Temple called Ivy Williams to the bar, making her the first female barrister in England and Wales. The Temple suffered massively during The Blitz in the Second World War, including attacks on 19 September and 26 September 1940, which destroyed the Library clocktower and the Hall respectively; on 10–11 May 1941 the Inn was hit by a series of incendiaries which destroyed the inside of Temple Church, the Hall, the Library and many sets of chambers. Fires continued to burn for another day, despite the assistance of the Fire Brigade and several barristers and employees.

It was decided not to start rebuilding until after the cessation of hostilities, and plans began in 1944, when the Temple contacted the War Damage Commission to provide the £1.5 million to cover the damage. £1.4 million was provided, with the rest found elsewhere. There was a further delay due to the Temple's choice of architect, Hubert Worthington, who was so slow that the Benchers ended up replacing him with his junior associate, T.W. Sutcliffe, and eventually Sir Edward Maufe. The chambers were the priority, with parts of King's Bench Walk finished in 1949, and the final building (the Library) was opened on 21 April 1958.

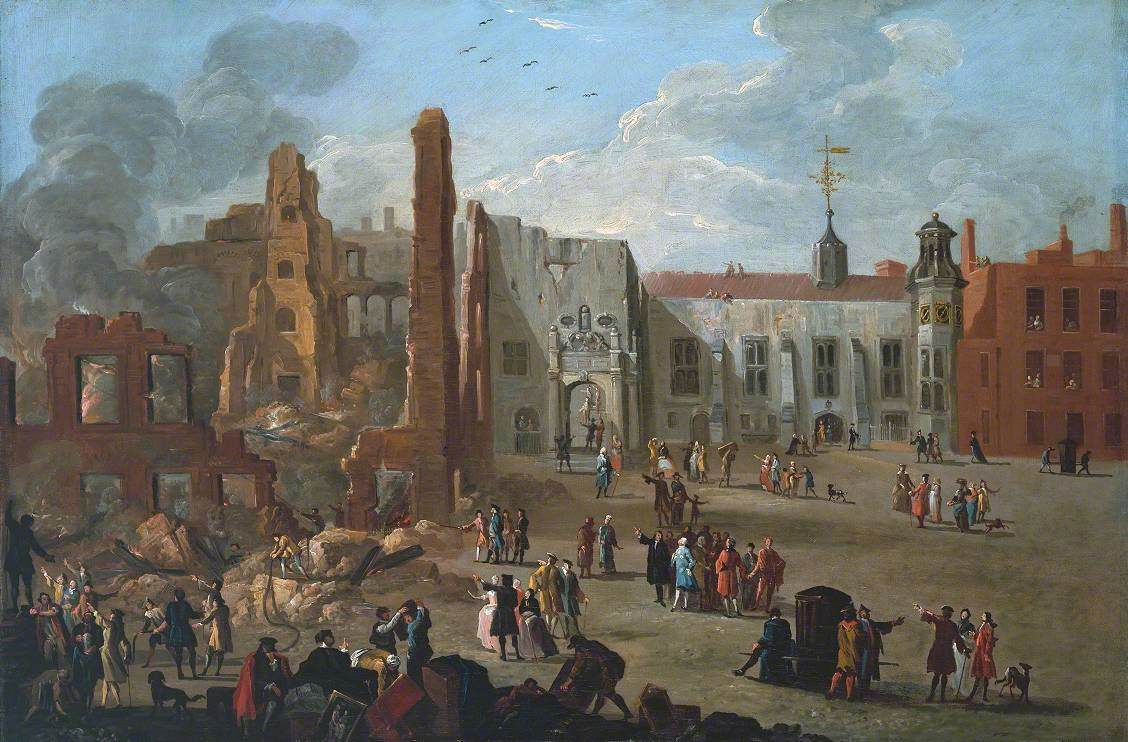
The Inner Temple after the Fire of 4 January 1737 by Richard Wilson (1714–1782), National Gallery.

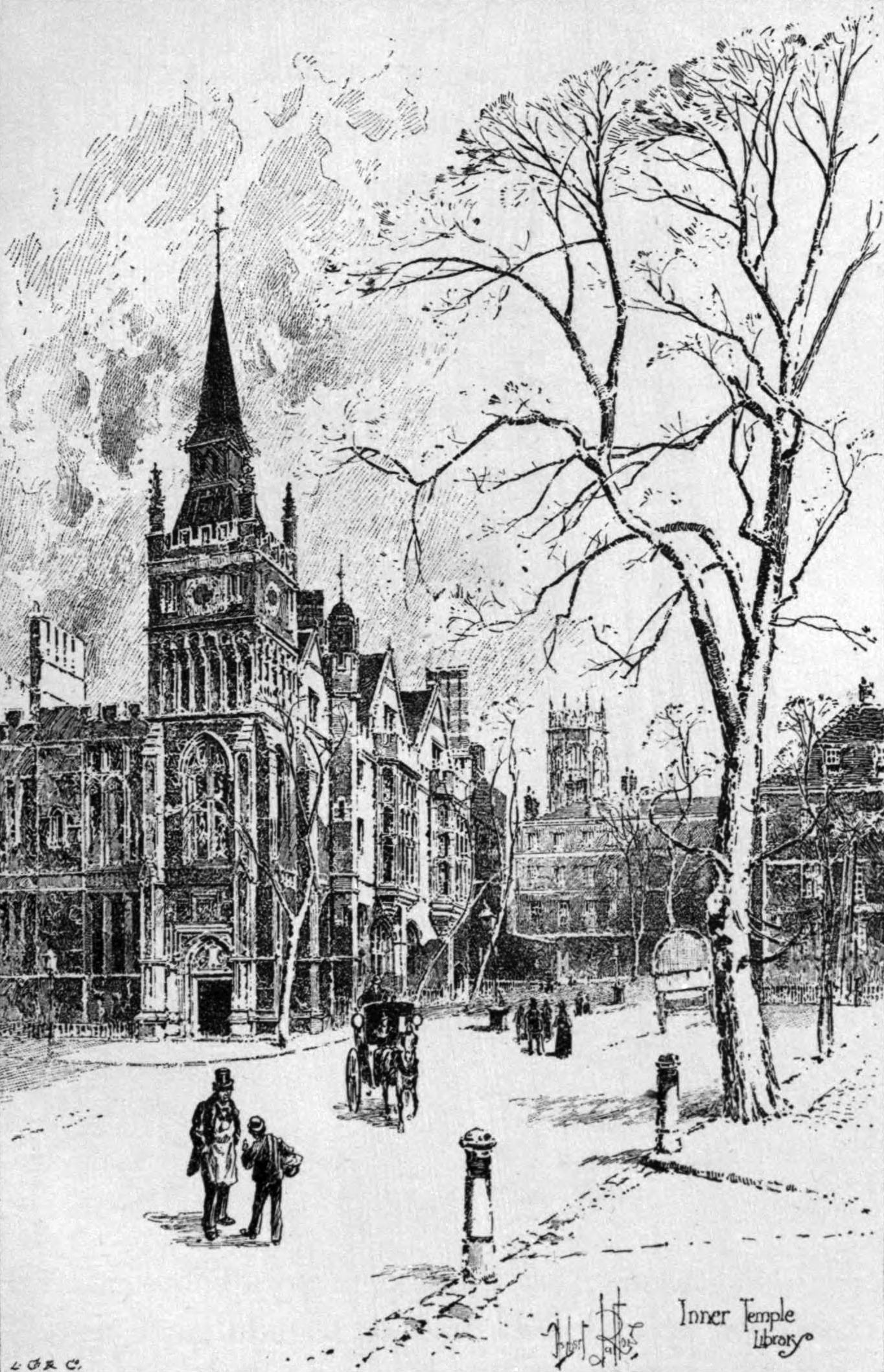
The Inner Temple Library circa 1895 by Herbert Railton (1857–1910).

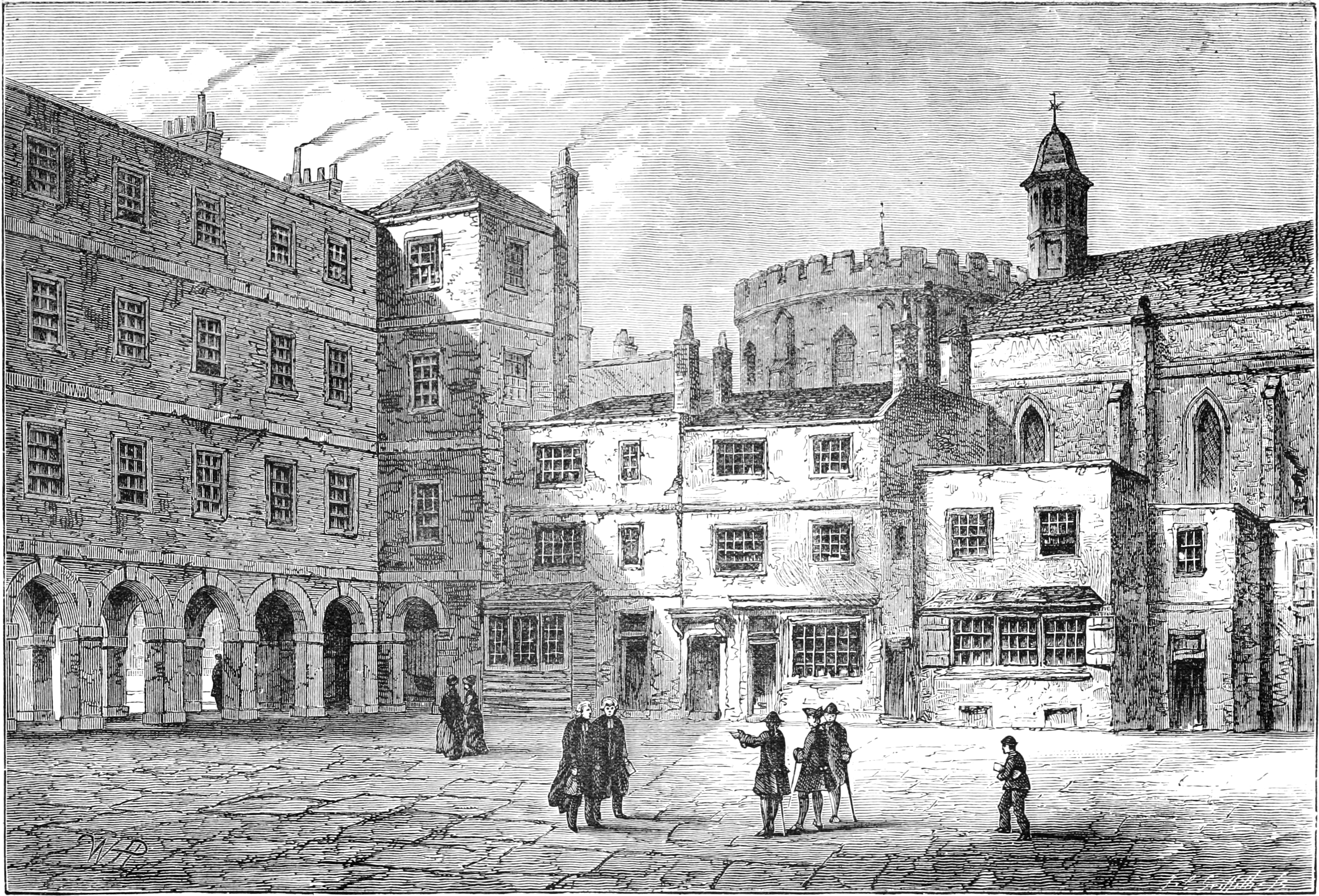
Part of the Inner Temple, printed in Old and New London vol 1 by George Walter Thornbury (1828–1876)

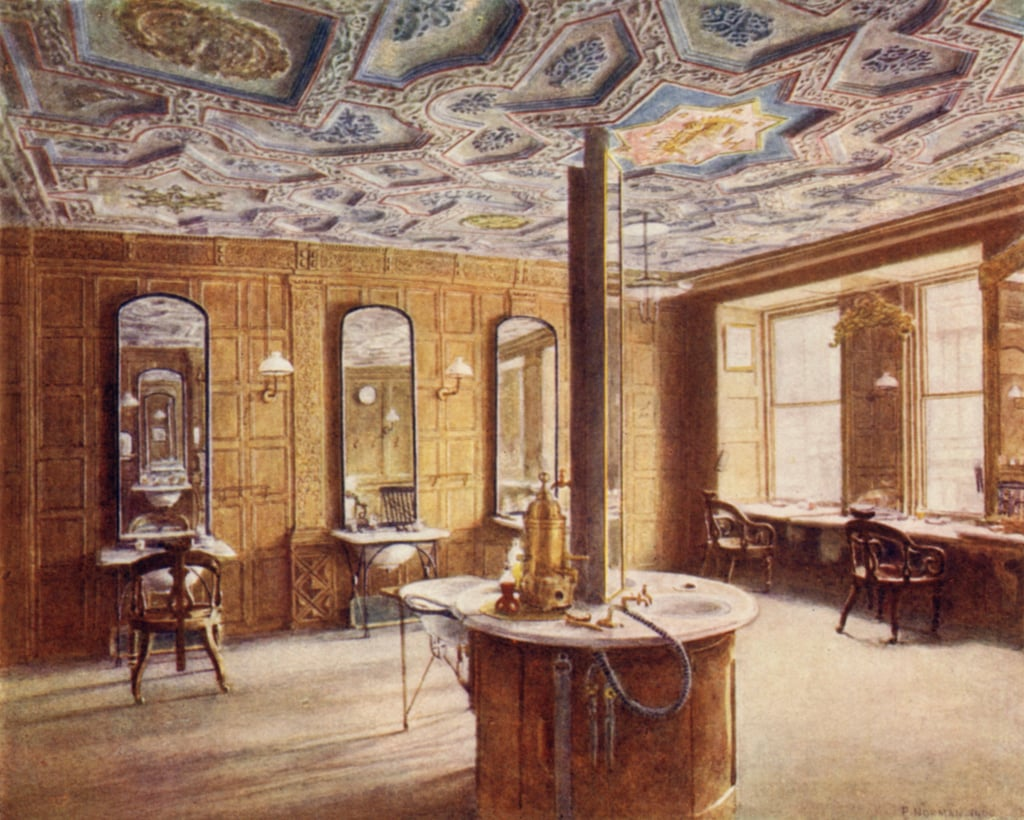
Room in Inner Temple Gate-house 1899 by Philip Norman (1842–1931).

In 2001 the Inner Temple bought the neighbouring 1–2 Serjeant's Inn, which can be accessed directly from the Inner Temple, with the intention of converting it to barristers' chambers. However, instead, the premises has been let on a 99-year lease to Apex Hotels. No. 3 Serjeant's Inn has been a barristers' chambers, occupying commercial premises, since 1986. Mitre Court, which connects the Inner Temple area, Serjeant's Inn and Fleet Street, is occupied as barristers' chambers, residential flats and more recently, solicitors.

== Structure and governance ==
The Inner Temple is governed by the Parliament, an executive council made up of the elected Benchers. The Parliament is led by the Treasurer, who is elected annually to serve a one-year term; the Treasurer for 2023 is Sir Robert Francis KC. The Inner Temple also has a Reader, who traditionally holds the position for a year before being appointed as Treasurer; the Reader for 2023 is Richard Salter KC.

The Inner Temple was historically governed by a Treasurer and three Governors. Members were divided into two categories; Clerks (Clerici) admitted to Clerks' Commons and Fellows (Socii) admitted to Fellows' Commons. The Governors held Parliament with a small group of senior barristers; in 1508, for example, Parliament was held with three Governors and four senior barristers. The last Governor was elected in 1566, and Benchers took over later that century. Benchers, or Masters of the Bench, are elected members of the Parliament responsible for overseeing the estates, the Inn's finances and setting internal policy. Today there are approximately 350 Governing Benchers (barristers and members of the judiciary) and honorary, academic and Royal Benchers appointed, as well as those practising in other jurisdictions.

=== Coat of arms ===
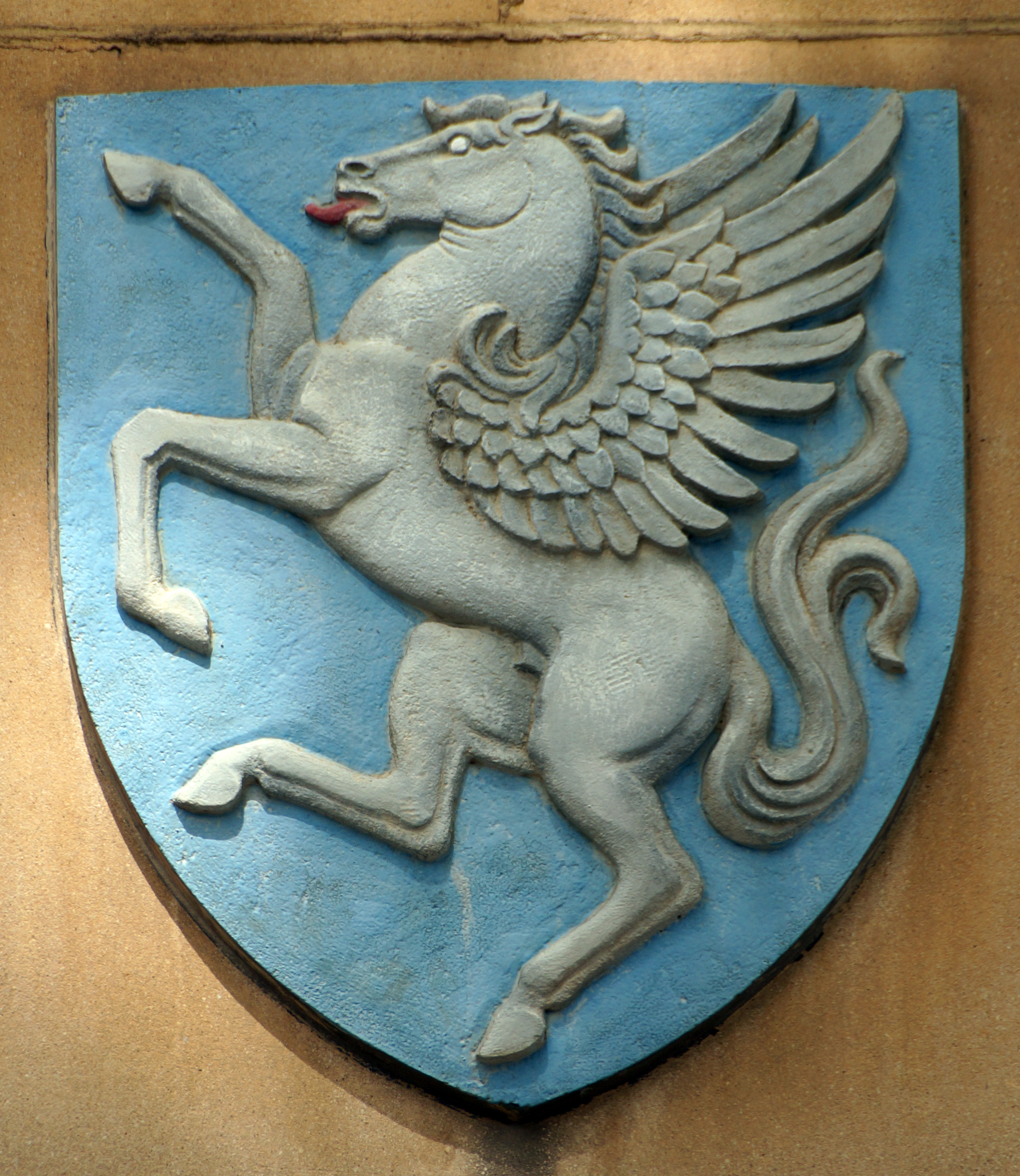
Arms of the Inner Temple

The coat of arms of the Inner Temple is, in blazon, "Azure a pegasus salient argent", or a silver Pegasus in a blue background. Gerard Legh is normally given the credit for having suggested the Pegasus as a coat of arms, having given an account of Robert Dudley playing the part of Prince Pallaphilos, a patron of the Honorable Order of Pegasus in the 1561 Christmas revels. It may alternatively have come about because of the tiles in Temple Church, which show a knight on horseback with a shield and sword raised. From this point onwards, the arms were considered the Temple's property, and they were confirmed by the College of Arms in 1967.

=== Liberty ===
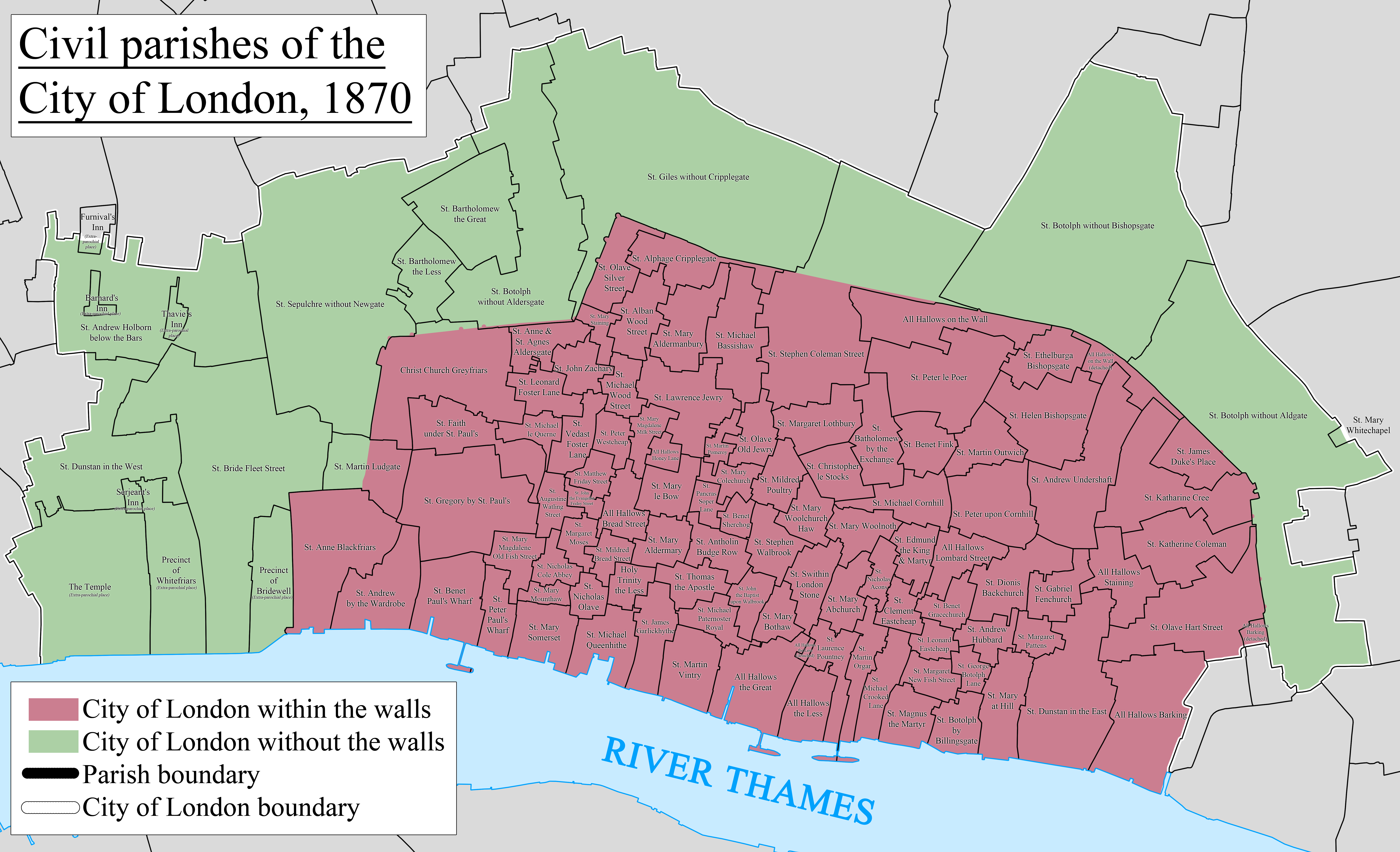
Map of the civil parishes of the City of London, including the Temple

Inner Temple (together with the neighbouring Middle Temple) is also one of the few remaining liberties, an old name for a type of administrative division. It is an independent extra-parochial area, historically not governed by the City of London Corporation (and is today regarded as a local authority for most purposes) and equally outside the ecclesiastical jurisdiction of the Bishop of London. The Inner Temple's functions as a local council are set out in the Temples Order 1971.

It geographically falls within the boundaries and liberties of the City, but can be thought of as an independent enclave.

== Plate ==
The Inner Temple is noted for its collection of silver and pewter plate, described in the early 20th century as similar in value to that of Oxford or Cambridge University. The first reference to plate is in 1534, with a silver cup left to the Temple as part of the estate of a Master Sutton. Further pieces were added over the next century, with Robert Bowes giving a silver gilt cup to Sir John Baker in 1552. The cup, which was shaped like a melon with feet formed from the "tendrils" of the melon, is a prized possession of the Temple. Nicholas Hare left three silver salt cellars for the use of the Benchers in 1597. Two silver candlesticks were bought in 1606, another salt cellar in 1610 and six silver spoons in 1619. A large part of the "house plate" was stolen in 1643, and it is unknown whether it was recovered, although money was spent in prosecuting the offender.

Two silver cups were bought in 1699, and records from 1 January 1703 show that the Temple owned one gilt cup (the "melon" cup) five salt cellars, ten large cups, twelve little cups, and twenty-three spoons. Twelve more spoons were bought in 1707, along with another silver cup, and at some point in this period the Temple purchased or was given a nef. A dozen teaspoons were bought in 1750, a coffee pot in 1788 and an "argyle" or gravy holder in 1790.

== Buildings ==
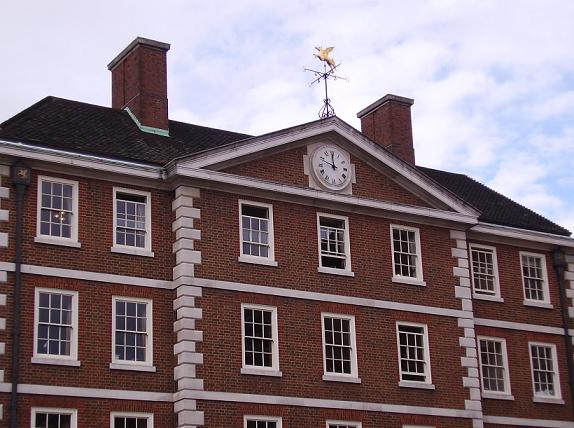
Crown Office Row

The Inner Temple contains many buildings, some modern and some ancient, although only Temple Church dates back to the time of the Knights Templars who originally inhabited the site.

=== Chambers ===
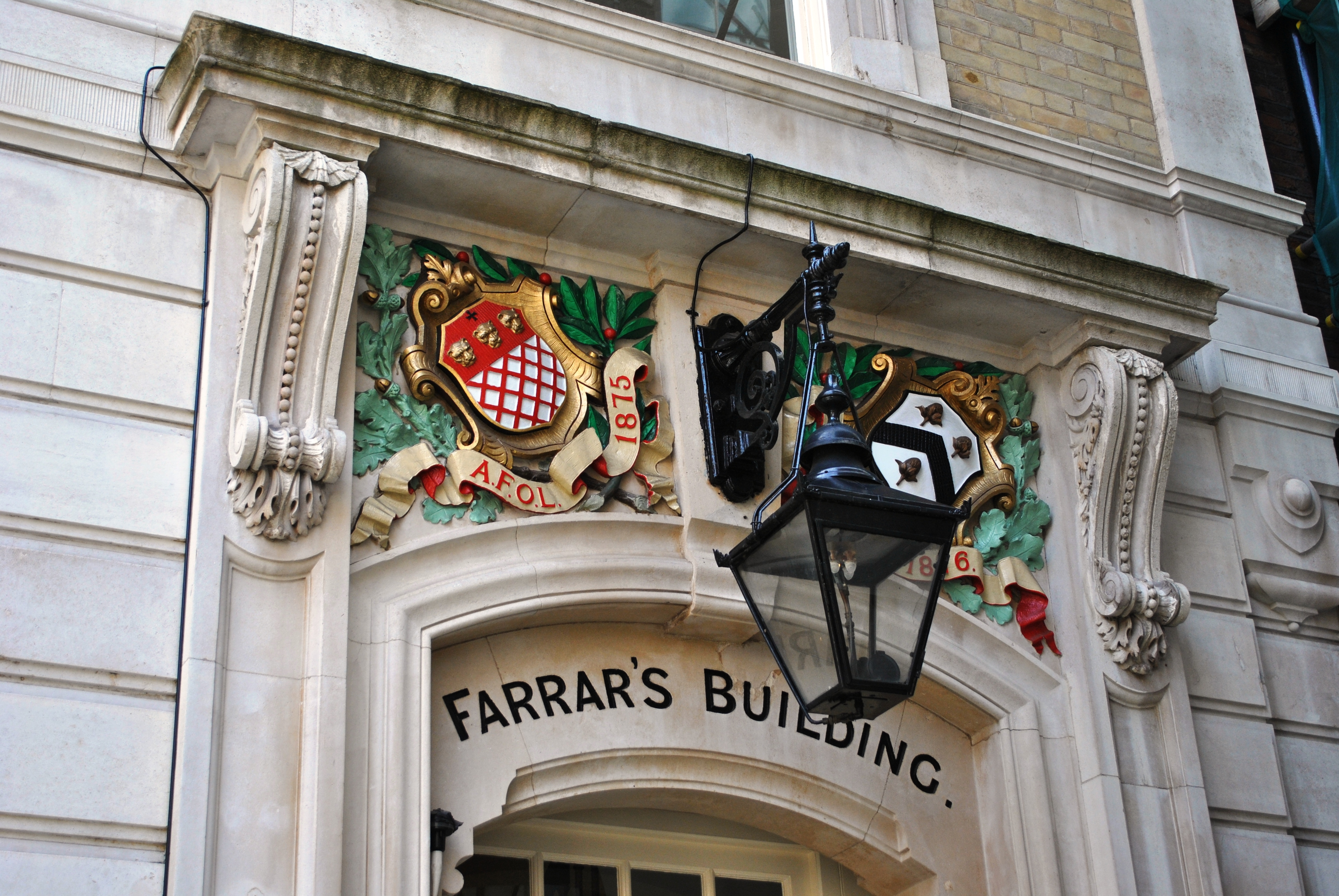
Farrar's Building

The Inn contains several buildings and sets of buildings used to house barristers' chambers, with those rooms above the second floor generally being residential in nature. The sets are Crown Office Row, Dr Johnson's Buildings, Farrar's Building, Francis Taylor Building, Harcourt Buildings, Hare Court, King's Bench Walk, Littleton Building, Mitre Court Buildings, Paper Buildings and the eastern side of Temple Gardens.

Crown Office Row was named after the Crown Office, which used to sit on the site and was removed in 1621. The first building (described by Charles Dugdale as "the Great Brick Building over against the Garden") was constructed in 1628, and completely replaced in 1737. The current buildings were designed and built by Sir Edward Maufe. Charles Lamb was born in No. 2 Crown Office Row, which was destroyed during the Second World War, and Thomas Coventry maintained a set of chambers there.

Harcourt Buildings were first built in 1703 by John Banks and named after Simon Harcourt, the Treasurer of the time. There were three buildings, 50 feet wide, 27 feet deep and 3 storeys high. Replacements were constructed between 1832 and 1833, and were not particularly attractive—Hugh Bellot said that they "could scarcely be more unsightly". These replacements were destroyed in 1941, and new buildings were built based on a design by Hubert Worthington.

Hare Court was named after Nicholas Hare, who built the first set in 1567. The west and south sides were destroyed in the fire of 1678. On 31 May 1679 orders were given to replace the west side with four new buildings three storeys high, which were funded by the Treasurer (Thomas Hanmer) and the tenants at the time, including Judge Jeffreys. The Court features a pump, the water of which was noted in the 19th century for its purity.

King's Bench Walk has contained buildings since at least 1543, although these were burnt down in the Great Fire of London in 1666 and their replacements destroyed in another fire in 1677. The buildings take their name from the Office of the King's Bench, which was situated in the row and destroyed in the 1677 fire. Buildings were reconstructed in 1678 and 1684, and a noted inhabitant of these early constructs was Lord Mansfield. The current buildings date from the first, 1678 construction to, most recently, chambers built in 1948.

Mitre Court Buildings are on the site of Fuller's Rents, constructed in 1562 by John Fuller, the Temple's Treasurer. Noted residents of chambers here included Sir Edward Coke. Mitre Court was erected on the site in 1830, and based on a design by Robert Smirke. While constructing it the labourers found a hoard of 67 guineas dated from the reigns of monarchs from Charles II to George II, which were confiscated by the Clerk of the Works.

Paper Buildings are on the site of Heyward's Buildings, constructed in 1610. The "paper" part of the name comes from the fact that they were built from timber, lath and plaster, a construction method known as "paperwork". A fire in 1838 destroyed three of the buildings, which were immediately replaced with a design by Robert Smirke, with Sydney Smirke later adding two more buildings. A famous resident of (at the time) Heyward's Buildings was John Selden, who was one of the original tenants and shared a set of chambers with Heyward himself.

=== Gardens and Gateway ===
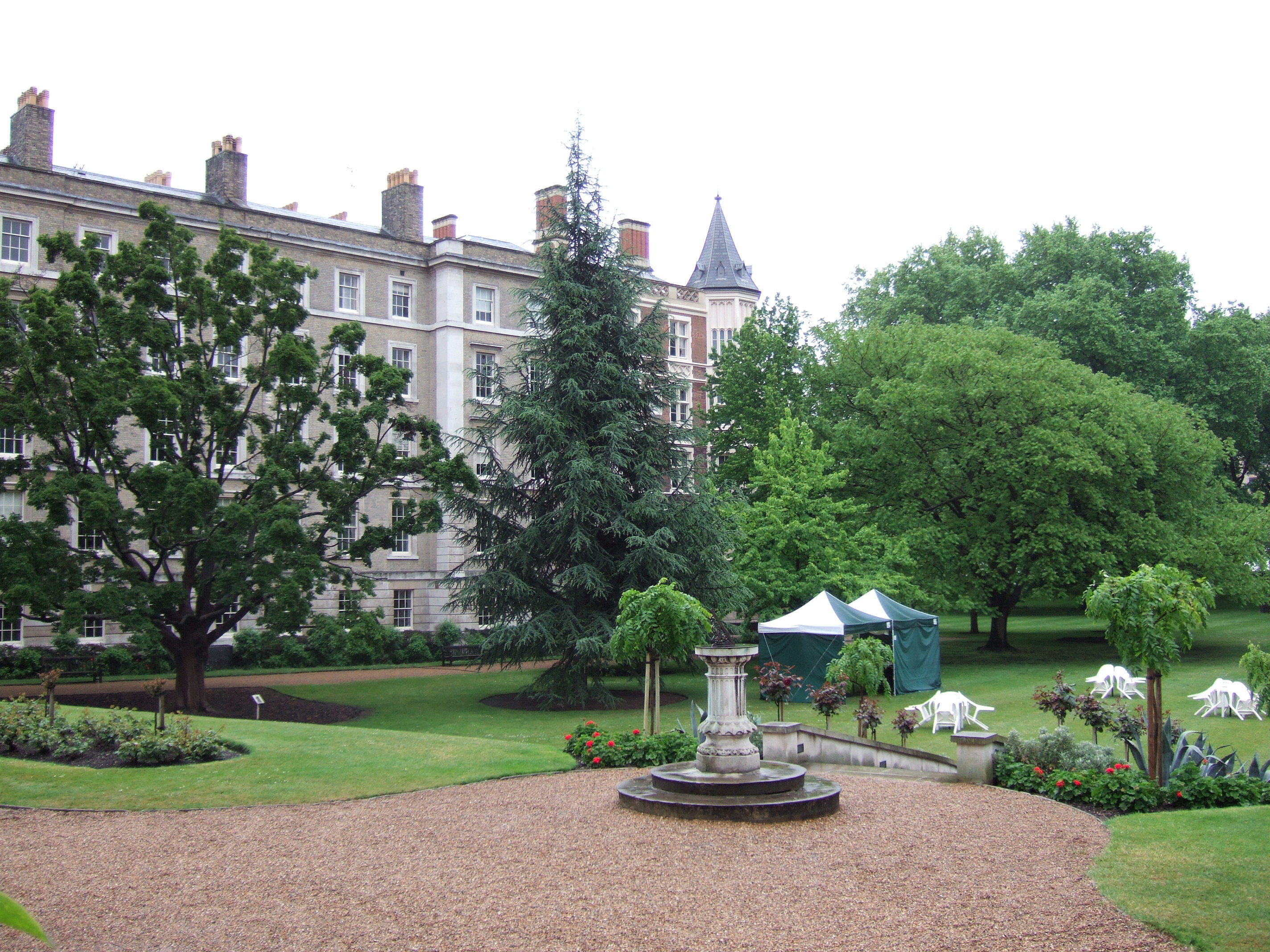
Part of the Inner Temple Garden and buildings

Inner Temple Gardens were laid out around 1601, with a set of decorated railings added in 1618 with the Temple's pegasus and the griffin of Gray's Inn, a sign of the strong relationship between the two; the design was included in the new iron gates made in 1730, which are still present. The gardens contain various landmarks, including a sundial from 1707 by Edward Strong the Elder, a pair of cisterns dated from 1730 and a lead statute of a blackmoor by John Nost, which was transferred from Clifford's Inn when Clifford's was destroyed. A rookery was established during the 18th century by Edward Northey, who brought a colony of crows from his estates in Epsom to fill it. The gardens were previously noted for their roses, and William Shakespeare claimed that the Wars of the Roses started in the Inner Temple Garden. The gardens have recently been the subject of substantial restoration under the auspices of the Master of the Garden, Oliver Sells QC. In 1870 Robert Marnock re-designed the Inner Temple Garden.

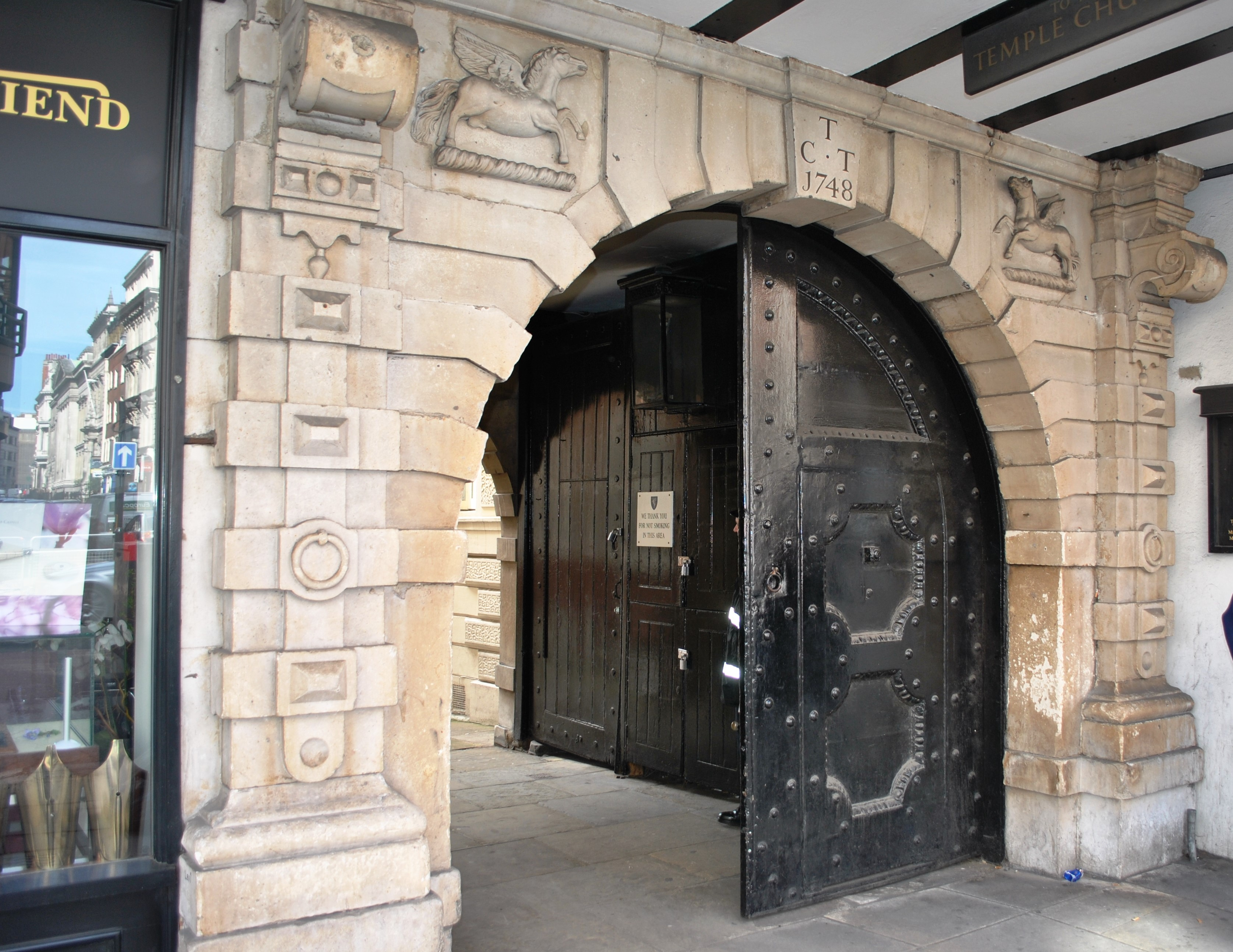
Inner Temple Gateway

The Gateway, at the top of Inner Temple Lane on Fleet Street, is thought to have existed in the same location since the founding of the Temples by the Knights Templar. It was rebuilt in 1610 by John Bennett, the King's Serjeant-at-Arms, and again rebuilt in 1748. The building above it (which is not owned by the Inn) is reputed to have been the council chambers of Henry Frederick, Prince of Wales and Charles, Prince of Wales, later Charles I.

=== Hall ===
The original Knights' Templar Hall was replaced in the fourteenth or fifteenth century. It was extensively repaired in 1606 and 1629, but was still in poor condition in 1816. Despite this, little was done at that time but replacing the timbers which had gone rotten and patching the crumbling walls with brick. As a result of the poor condition and the increasing numbers of barristers, it was demolished in 1868.

Its replacement was a larger hall in the Gothic style, designed by Sydney Smirke, which was opened on 14 May 1870 by Princess Louise. The new Hall was 94 feet long, 41 feet wide and 40 feet high, with glass windows featuring the coats of arms of noted Treasurers from 1506 onwards running around the room. There were two doors, one to the south and one to the north, which are said by William Dugdale to be the remnants of a "great carved screen" erected in 1574.

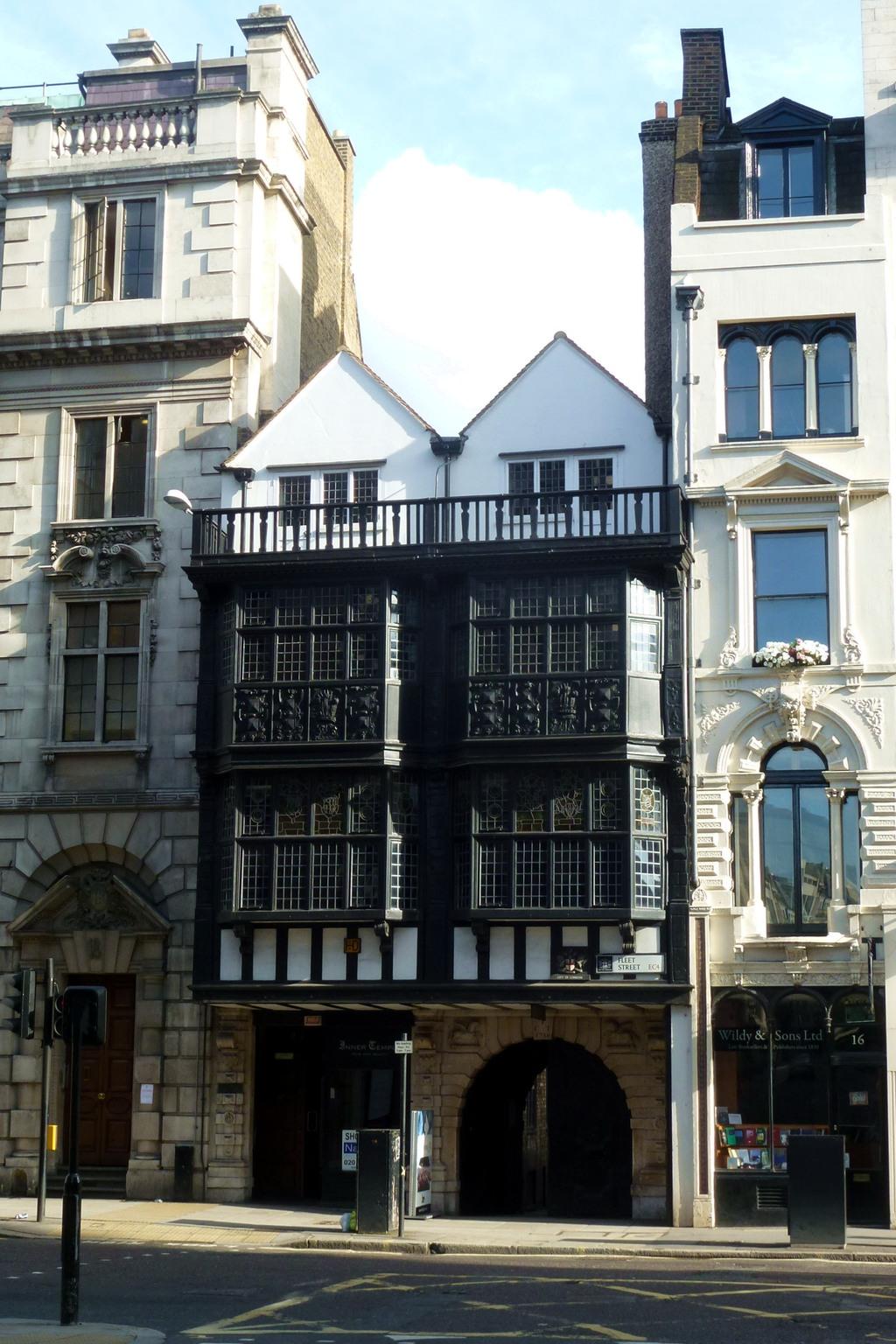
The entrance to the Inner Temple from Fleet Street in August 2012

The Hall was destroyed during the Second World War, and the foundation stone for the new hall was laid by Queen Elizabeth in 1952. The building was designed by Hubert Worthington and opened in 1955 as part of a complex involving the Hall, Library and Benchers' Chambers.

=== Library ===
The original Library existed from at least 1506, and consisted of a single room. This was not a dedicated library, as it was also used for dining when there were too many barristers for the hall, and later for moots. By 1607 a second room had been added, and Edward Coke donated a copy of his Reports for the library a year later. The Library of the Inner Temple was far superior to those of the other Inns of Court, and "placed the House far in advance of the other societies".

The Library refused to accept John Selden's manuscripts in 1654, most likely because the size of the collection would necessitate a new building, but it has been described as "the greatest loss which the Library of the Inner Temple ever sustained". The Library was entirely destroyed in the Great Fire of London, but a replacement was built in 1668. A second, smaller fire in 1679 necessitated the destruction of one library building to act as a firebreak and save the hall.

In 1707 the Inner Temple was offered the Petyt Manuscripts and a sum of £150 to build a new Library, which was completed in 1709 and consisted of three rooms. A Librarian was appointed immediately, and the practice continues to this day. Modifications were made in 1867, 1872 and 1882 which extended the Library to eight rooms A new Library was built on the site of the old one in the 19th century, with the north wing being completed in 1882, and contained 26,000 law volumes, as well as 36,000 historical and architectural texts. This building was destroyed during the Second World War, and although some of the rarest manuscripts had been moved off site, 45,000 books were lost. A replacement Library was built in 1958, and currently contains approximately 70,000 books.

=== Temple Church ===
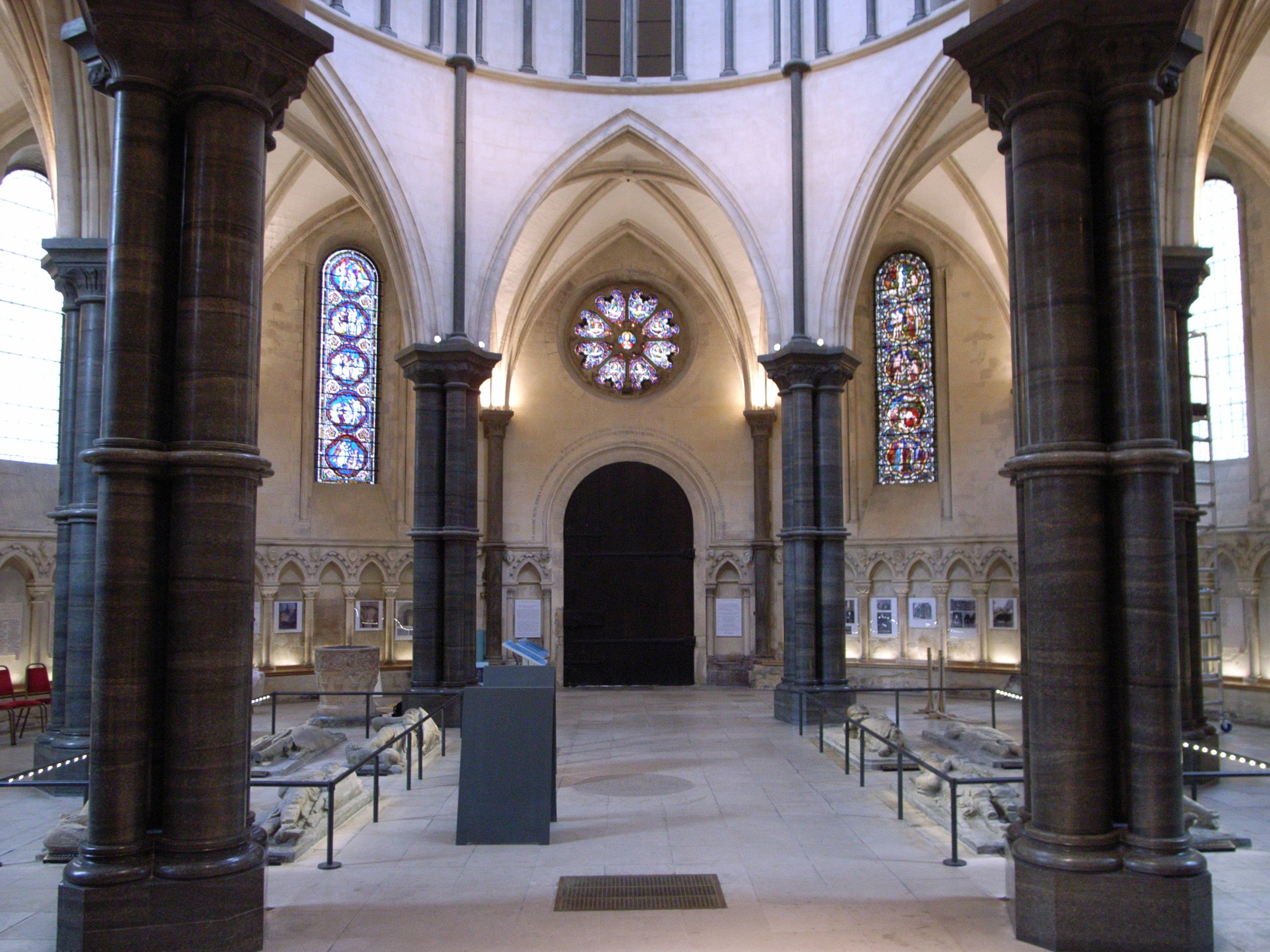
Part of Temple Church

Temple Church has been described as "the finest of the four round churches still existing in London". The original Round was constructed in 1185 by the Knights Templar and consecrated by the Patriarch of Jerusalem on 10 February. The church was highly regarded during this period, with William the Marshal buried there and Henry III initially making plans before changing to Westminster Abbey.

After the fall of the Templars the church, along with the rest of the Temple, fell into the hands of the Knights Hospitaller, and from there passed to Henry VIII, who appointed a priest, known as the Master of the Temple. The Royal Charter granted by James I that guaranteed the independence of the Inner and Middle Temples did so on the condition that the Temples maintain the church, a requirement which has been followed to this day. Both societies also own the Master's House next to the church, a Georgian townhouse built in 1764.

During the reign of Charles II the elegant columns which had dominated the church were covered with 8-foot-tall (2.4 m) oak wainscotting. Repairs to the east end of the church took place in 1707, and the exterior of the north and east sides was repaired in 1737. Some further repairs took place in 1811, but the main restoration happened in 1837, when Robert Smirke restored the south side and removed most of the wainscotting. This was followed with more repairs in 1845, which lowered the floor to its original height, removed ugly whitewash which had been added a century earlier and led to the discovery of a marble piscina at the east end.

All of this work was destroyed on 10 May 1941 during the Second World War when firebombs gutted the church. Over the next decade the church was restored, and it was reconsecrated in 1954 by the Archbishop of Canterbury.

== Notable members ==
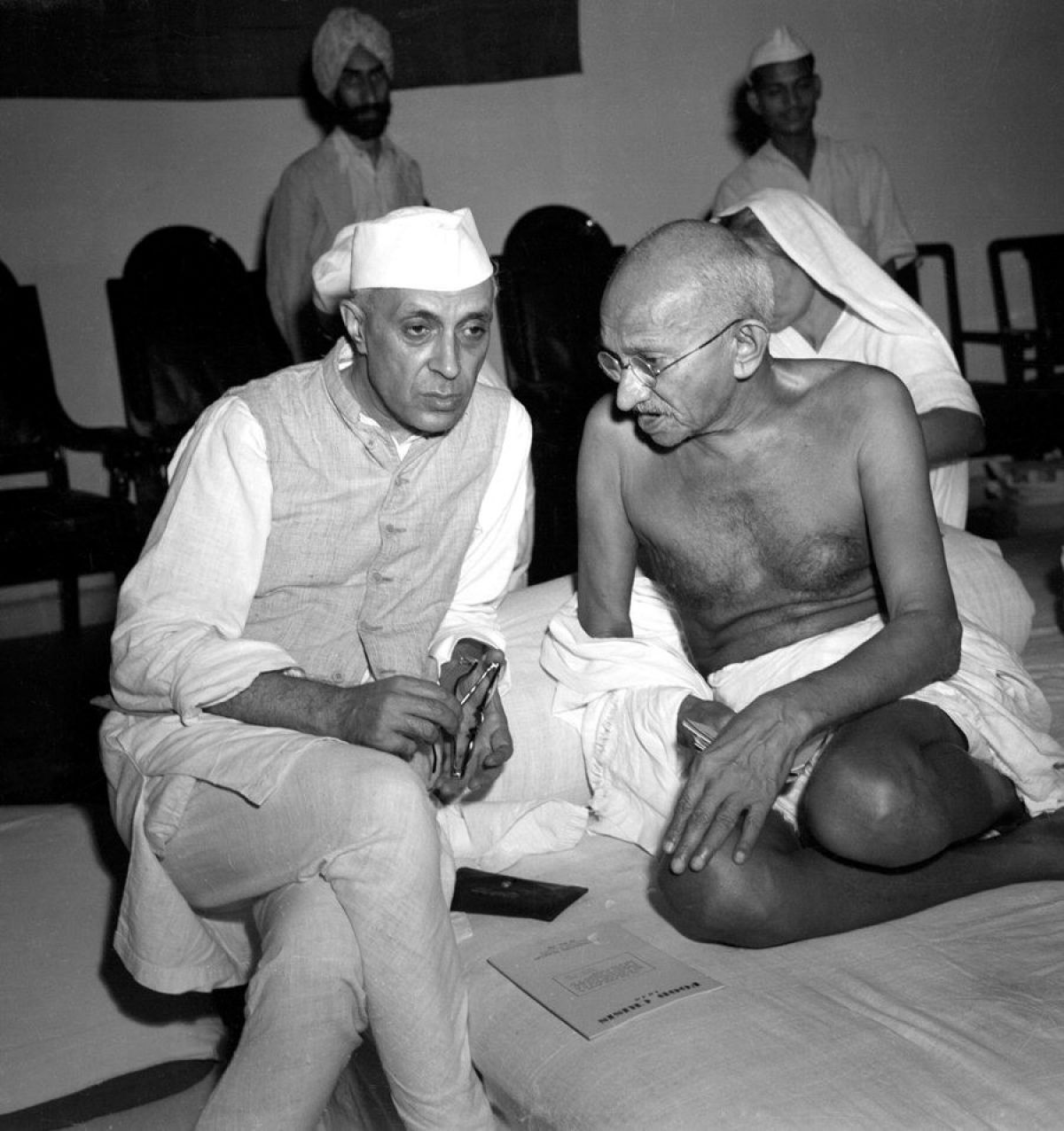
The Indian National Congress leaders Mahatma Gandhi and Jawaharlal Nehru studied law at the Inner Temple

Significant members of the judiciary include Sir Edward Coke, Lady Justice Butler-Sloss, and Lord Justice Birkett. Justice S.M.A. Belgore, GCON, a former Chief Justice of Nigeria, was also a member. Several barrister members have gone on to be highly important, including Edward Marshall-Hall, and legal academics have also been members, such as Sir John Baker.

The first Prime Minister of India, Jawaharlal Nehru; the Indian independence activist, Mahatma Gandhi; The first Prime Minister of Pakistan Liaqat Ali Khan was called to Bar in 1922 by one of his English law professors. British Prime Ministers Clement Attlee and George Grenville have both been members; as was the first Prime Minister of Malaysia, Tunku Abdul Rahman; the fifth President of India, Fakhruddin Ali Ahmed; the fourth Prime Minister of Ceylon, S. W. R. D. Bandaranaike; the Chief Minister of West Bengal, Siddhartha Shankar Ray, Pt Ram Chandra Kukreti, one of the first barristers of Dehradun, India, was also its member.

Outside of the law and politics, members have included the writer and journalist Bertram Fletcher Robinson, poet Arthur Brooke, Admiral Francis Drake, dramatist W. S. Gilbert, the economist John Maynard Keynes, King Jigme Khesar Namgyel Wangchuck of Bhutan, Burma's first recorded archaeologist Taw Sein Ko, Herbert Broom legal scholar, and diplomat and Righteous among the Nations Prince Constantin Karadja.

== See also ==
- Thomas Joshua Platt

== Bibliography ==
- Aikenhead, Ian D. (1977). "Students of the Common Law 1590–1615: Lives and Ideas at the Inns of Court". The University of Toronto Law Journal. 27 (3). University of Toronto: 243–256. doi:10.2307/825568. ISSN 0042-0220. JSTOR 825568.
- Axton, Marie (1970). "Robert Dudley and the Inner Temple Revels". The Historical Journal. 13 (3). Cambridge University Press: 365–378. doi:10.1017/S0018246X00009237. ISSN 1469-5103. S2CID 162256308.
- Bellot, Hugh (1902). The Inner and Middle Temple, legal, literary, and historic associations. London: Methuen & Co. OCLC 585828.
- Boyer, Allen D. (2003). Sir Edward Coke and the Elizabethan Age. Stanford University Press. ISBN 0-8047-4809-8.
- "Fever in the Inner Temple". The British Medical Journal. 1 (1202). BMJ publishing group. 1884. ISSN 0959-8138.
- Douthwaite, William Ralph (1886). Gray's Inn, Its History & Associations. Reeves and Turner. OCLC 2578698.
- Dugdale, William; William Herbert (1804). Antiquities of the Inns of court and chancery: containing historical and descriptive sketches relative to their original foundation, customs, ceremonies, buildings, government, &c., &c., with a concise history of the English law. London: Vernor and Hood. OCLC 213520279.
- Fletcher, Reginald (1901). The Pension book of Gray's Inn (records of the honourable society) 1569–1669. Vol. I. Chiswick Press. OCLC 59205885.
- Holdsworth, William (1921). "The Disappearance of the Educational System of the Inns of Court". University of Pennsylvania Law Review and American Law Register. 69 (3). University of Pennsylvania: 201–222. doi:10.2307/3314249. ISSN 0749-9833. JSTOR 3314249.
- Hyde, H. Montgomery (1965). Norman Birkett: The Life of Lord Birkett of Ulverston. Hamish Hamilton. ASIN B000O8CESO. OCLC 255057963.
- Jones, E.A. (1939). "Silver at the Inner Temple". The Burlington Magazine. 75 (436). The Burlington Magazine Publications, Ltd. ISSN 0951-0788.
- Loftie, W J (1895). The Inns of Court and Chancery. New York: Macmillan & co. OCLC 592845.
- Pearce, Robert Richard (1848). History of the Inns of Court and Chancery: With Notices of Their Ancient Discipline, Rules, Orders, and Customs, Readings, Moots, Masques, Revels, and Entertainments. R. Bentley. OCLC 16803021.
- Ringrose, Hyacinthe (1909). The Inns of Court: an historical description of the Inns of court and chancery of England. Oxford: R.L. Williams. OCLC 80561477.
- Watt, Francis; Dunbar Plunket Barton; Charles Benham (1928). The Story of the Inns of Court. Boston: Houghton Mifflin. OCLC 77565485.
