= Edmund Weaver (publisher) =

English draper and bookseller

Edmund Weaver was an English draper and a bookseller in London in the 17th century.

== Life ==
Edmund Weaver was an apprentice to Thomas Wight and was 'clothed' in 1607 and became master of the Worshipful Company of Drapers in 1637. He was married to Jane Weaver, who died on 29 August 1636. He was appointed a Commissioner of Hereford by an act of parliament in 1648.

Weaver had many important books printed so he could sell them in his shop near St Paul's Church in London. He published Robert Cawdrey's book, A Table Alphabeticall in 1604. A Table Alphabeticall was the first monolingual dictionary in the English language. Weaver went on to publish three subsequent editions of A Table Alphabeticall.

== Other books published ==
- A Discourse About the State of True Happinesse. Delivered in Certaine Sermons in Oxford, and at Pauls Crosse. Robert Bolton, Batchelour in Divinitie, and Minister of Gods Word at Broughton in Northampton Shire. The sixth Edition, corrected and amended, with a Table thereunto annexed. At London, Imprinted by Iohn Legatt, for Edmund Weaver, and are to be sold at his Shop at the great North doore of Pauls Church. 1636.
- A direct answer vnto the scandalous exceptions, which Theophilus Higgons hath lately obiected against D. Morton : In the which there is principally discussed, two of the most notorious obiections vsed by the Romanists, viz. 1. M. Luthers conference with the diuell, and 2. The sense of the article of Christ his descension into hell, Thomas Morton, Printed [by R. Field] for Edmund Weaver, London, 1609
- Henry Burton (1624). A Censure of Simonie. Or A Most Important Case of Conscience Concerning Simonie Briefly Discussed, Not Altogether Perhaps Vnparallell for the Meridian of These Times. London: Printed by William Stansby, for Edmund Weauer and Iohn Smethwicke. OCLC 1203230194.
- Looke beyond Luther: Or An Answere to that question, so often and so insultingy proposed by our Adversaries, asking us; Where this our Religion was before Luthers time? Whereto are added sound props to beare up honest-hearted Protestants, that they fall not from their saving-faith. Fourth Edition, Richard Bernard, 55pp. London: by Felix Kyngston, and are to be sold by Edmund Weaver, 1624.
- A true discouery of the empericke with the fugitiue, physition and quacksaluer who display their banners vpon posts: whereby his Maiesties subiects are not onely deceiued, but greatly endangered in the health of their bodies: being very profitable as well for the ignorant, as for the learned: by I.C. Doctor in Physicke, John Cotta, Imprinted at London : By William Iones, and are to be sold by Edmund [Weaver] at the great North doore of S. Pauls Church, 1617.
- Northerne Poems congratulating the King's Maiesties most happy and peaceable entrance to the crowne of England:

'Sorrowe was ouer night
But joy came in the morning.'
'Sero, quamvis serio,
Sat cito, si sat bene.'
'These come too late, though they import they love,
Nay, soone enough, if good enough they prove.'

Printed at London by John Windet for Edmund Weaver, and are to be solde at the Great North doore of Paules, 1604. Small 4to.
