= Thomas Hughes (dramatist) =

16th/17th-century English lawyer and dramatist

Thomas Hughes (fl. 1571 – 1623) was an English lawyer and dramatist.

A native of Cheshire, Hughes entered Queens' College, Cambridge, in 1571. He graduated and became a fellow of his college in 1576, and was afterwards a member of Gray's Inn.

== Works ==
Hughes wrote The Misfortunes of Arthur, Uther Pendragon's son reduced into tragical notes, which was performed at Greenwich in Queen Elizabeth I's presence on 28 February 1588. Nicholas Trotte provided the introduction, Francis Flower the choruses of Acts I and II, William Fulbecke two speeches, while three other gentlemen of Gray's Inn, one of whom was Francis Bacon, undertook the care of the dumb show.

The argument of the play, based on a story of incest and crime, was borrowed, in accordance with Senecan tradition, from mythical history, and the treatment is in close accordance with the model. The ghost of Gorlois, who was slain by Uther Pendragon, opens the play with a speech that reproduces passages spoken by the ghost of Tantalus in Seneca's play Thyestes; the tragic events are announced by a messenger, and the chorus comments on the course of the action. Dr W. J. Cunliffe has proved that Hughes's memory was saturated with Seneca, and that the play may be resolved into a patchwork of translations, with occasional original lines. Appendix II to his exhaustive essay On the Influence of Seneca on Elizabethan Tragedy (1893) gives a long list of parallel passages.

The Misfortunes of Arthur was reprinted in J. P. Collier's supplement to Dodsley's Old Plays; and by Harvey Carson Grumline (Berlin, 1900), who points out that Hughes's source was Geoffrey of Monmouth's Historia Britonum, not the Morte D'Arthur.

Hughes later became a magistrate at Wells, in Somerset and a useful ally of bishop James Montague of Bath and Wells. Perhaps inspired by nearby Glastonbury's Arthurian connections, Hughes took a keen interest in Glastonbury's history, and acquired antiquarian artefacts from the ruined abbey, such as the plaque commemorating the role of Joseph of Arimathea in founding the Old Church. He may well have owned the celebrated cross said to have been found in Arthur's tomb, which was later in the possession of Chancellor Hughes of Wells, who was probably his descendant. Hughes sent two men to Glastonbury one Christmas Eve to see whether the famous Holy Thorn of Glastonbury did indeed flower that night, as claimed. They were in luck, and "found the perfect Blossom about two or three of the Clock", which they took back to Hughes the following morning. Hughes may have had a hand in the 'Panegiricall entertainement" which the bishop produced for the queen, Anne of Denmark, probably at Wells in 1613.

== Notes ==
Attribution
