= William Fulbecke =

British historian, writer and lawyer

William Fullbecke (1560–1603?) was an English playwright, historian, lawyer and legal scholar, who did pioneering work in international law. He described himself as "maister of Artes, and student of the lawes of England."

== Life ==
He was a younger son of Thomas Fulbeck, who was mayor of Lincoln, and was born there. He studied at St Alban Hall, Christ Church and Gloucester Hall, Oxford, proceeding B.A. 1581, and M.A. 1584. In 1584 he moved to London and entered Gray's Inn, where he became a bencher.

== Writings ==
Fulbecke's "Direction..." (1600), discussed study methods for law students, techniques for arguing a case, and suggestions for further reading. It is also full of advice, such as admonishing law students not to study at night, because:

"for when the stomach is full and stuffed with meat, the abundance of humours is carried to the head, where it sticketh for a time and layeth as it were a lump of lead upon the brain."

This book has been very popular and has been reprinted over and over and is still in print. It demonstrates that Fulbecke was more comfortable with written civil law rather than the ambiguities that characterized common law at the time. Fulbeck displays his knowledge of medieval lawyers such as Bartolus of Sassoferrato, and 16th-century French legal scholars Guillaume Budé and François Hotman.

Fulbecke's "Pandectes" (1602) was one of the first books on international law.

Fulbecke collaborated with lawyer Thomas Hughes on the play The Misfortunes of Arthur for Queen Elizabeth I at Gray's Inn on 28 February 1588. The Misfortunes of Arthur was an imitation of a Senecan tragedy.

Fulbecke also wrote books on Roman history, including his popular 1601 version. Fulbecke describes it as:

"The use of this historie is threefold: first the revealing of the mischeifes of discord and civill discention… Secondly the opening of the cause hereof, which is nothing else but ambition, for out of this seed groweth a whole harvest of evils. Thirdly the declaring of the remedie, which is by humble estimation of our selves, by living well, not lurking well: by conversing in the light of the common weale with equals, not by complotting in darke conventicles against superiors."

== Works by Fullbecke ==
- A direction, or preparatiue to the study of the lawe: wherein is shewed what things ought to be observed and used of them that are addicted to the study of the law and what on the contrary part ought to be eschued and avoyded., William Fulbecke, London: Printed by Thomas Wight, 1600.
- An Historicall Collection of the Continuall Factions, Tumults and Massacres of the Romans and Italians during the space of one hundred and twentie yeares next before the peaceable empire of Augustus Caesar, William Fulbecke, (1601)
- A Parallele or Conference of the Civill Law, the Canon Law, and the Common Law of this Realme of England. Wherein the agreement and disagreement of these three Lawes . . . are opened and discussed [etc.]., William Fulbecke, Printed by Thomas Wight, London, 1601.
- The Pandectes of the Law of Nations: Contayning Severall Discourses of the Questions, Points, and Matters of Law, Wherein the Nations of the World Doe Consent and Accord. Giving Great Light to the Understanding and Opening of the Principall Objects, Questions, Rules, and Cases of the Civill Law, and Common Law of This Realme of England., William Fulbecke, London: Thomas Wight, 1602
- A booke of Christian ethicks or moral philosophie containing, the true difference and opposition, of the two incompatible qualities, vertue, and voluptuousnesse. Made by William Fulbecke, maister of Artes, and student of the lawes of England., William Fulbeck, At London : Imprinted by Richard Iones, dwelling at the signe of the Rose and Crowne neere Holborne bridge, 1587.
- An abridgement, or rather, a bridge of Roman histories to passe the neerest way from Titus Liuius to Cornelius Tacitus. Under which (in three bookes) as it were through three arches, for the space of sixe score yeeres, the fame and fortune of the Romans ebbs and flowes. By William Fulbecke, London : Printed by T. E[ast] for Richard More, 1608.
