= General Dispensary, Aldersgate Street =

Coordinates: 51.518702°N 0.096621°W

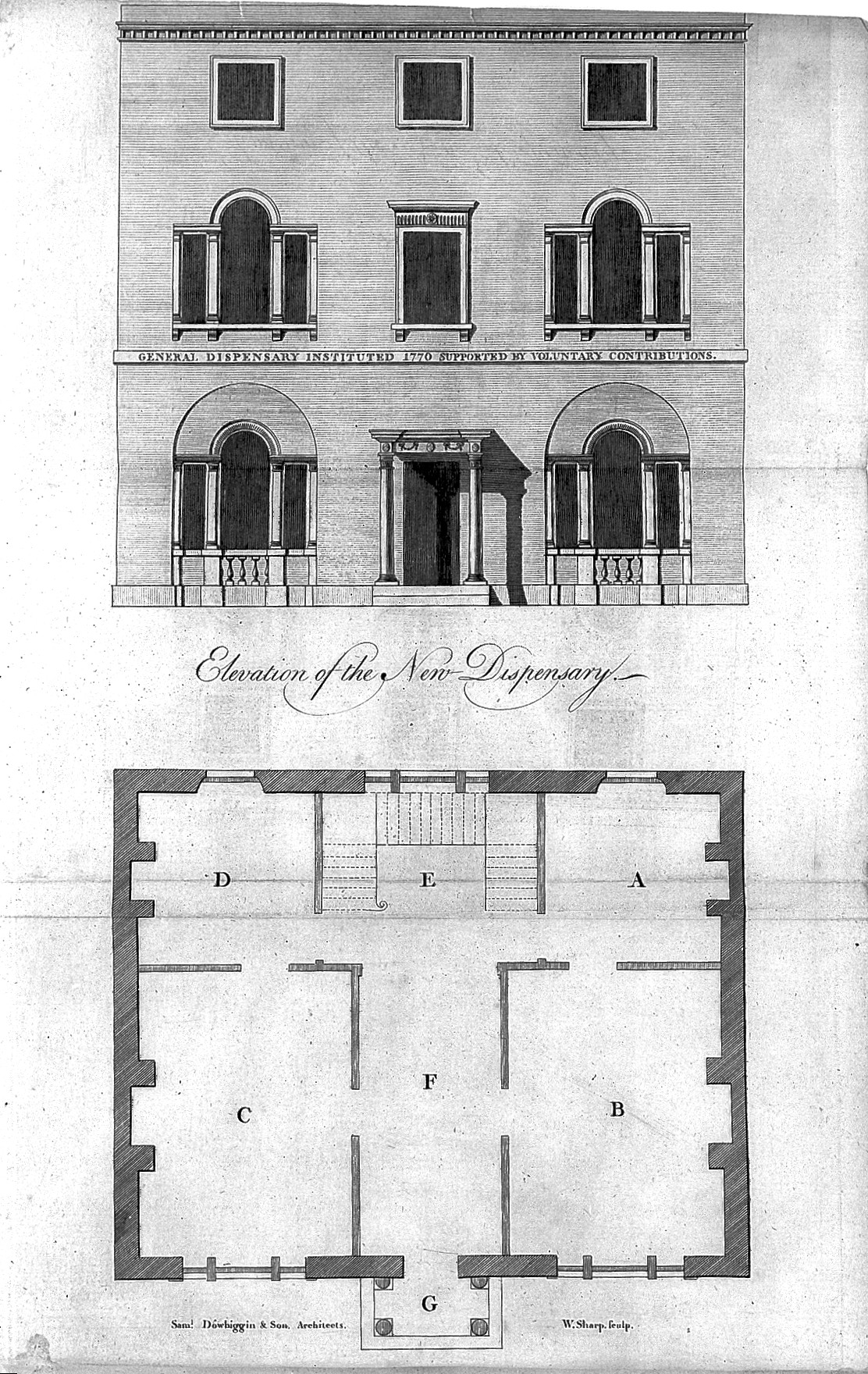
Plan of the General Dispensary at Aldersgate Street

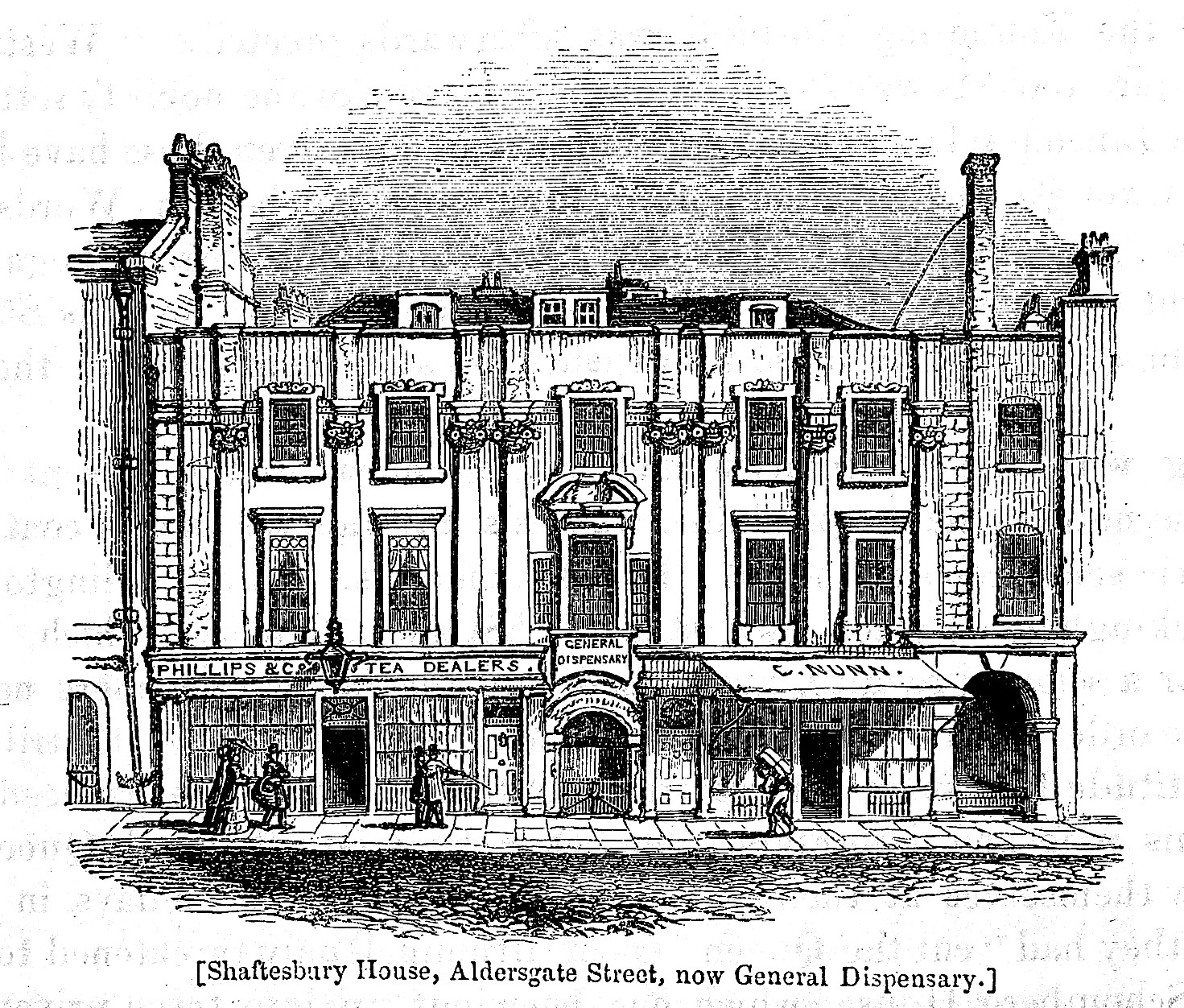
Shaftesbury House, site of the dispensary

The General Dispensary, Aldersgate Street, was a London dispensary which provided outpatient treatment and home-visiting for sick adults and children.

== Background ==
By 1700, a few London dispensaries were opened and endorsed by the Royal College of Physicians when a number of physicians returned after the fire of London after fleeing London from the Great Plague of 1665 and when an increasing number of apothecaries were treating the poor, resulting in competition. The situation changed after the Rose case. Eighteenth century London witnessed not just a building boom and extension of the city boundaries, but also a steep rise in poverty. By the end of the century, birth rates exceeded death rates and the population of London was 675,000 in the early part of the century and 900,000 in 1801. Public money spent on the poor increased disproportionately to the rise in population and reliance was put upon medical relief from private voluntary associations and philanthropy. In addition, the number of London hospitals increased but treatment was confined to within their walls and an unmet need for outpatient care of the poor contributed to the rise of the London dispensary.

== Origins ==
Following the popular dispensary opened within the Royal College of Physicians building at Warwick Lane and despite its closure in 1725, around 100 men provided the influence to create the General dispensary at Aldersgate street.

The dispensary was situated at 36 Aldersgate Street, an address at Shaftesbury House. It later became the City of London Lying-in Hospital before being used as dispensary.

It was founded in 1770 and opened by John Coakley Lettsom.

James Sims was one of the physicians.

== Workings ==
It was well organised, well staffed and soon became successful. Both physicians and apothecaries were hired.

== Premises ==
The dispensary was also known as the Aldersgate dispensary and renamed in 1844 as the Royal General dispensary. Six years later, the premises moved to 25 Bartholomews Close where it stood just shy of 30 years before being rebuilt. This new building was destroyed during the Blitz in 1941 and its workings continued at St. Bartholomew's hospital until 1948, when the dispensary came to an end.

== See also ==
- London House, Aldersgate Street
- Shaftesbury House, London
