= Alice Dixon Le Plongeon =

English photographer and archaeologist

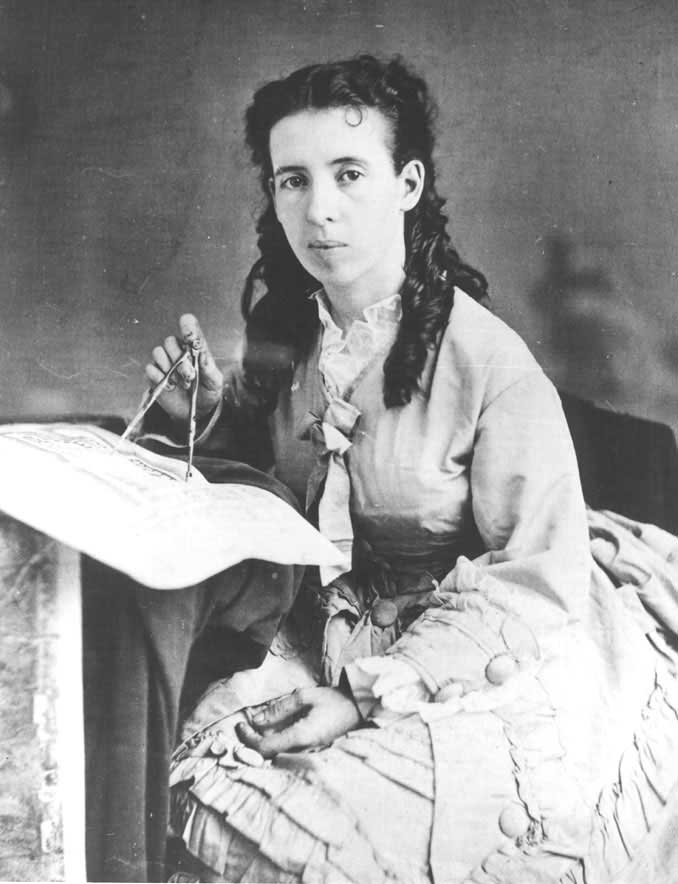
Portrait of Alice Dixon Le Plongeon, taken by her husband Augustus, ca. 1875

Alice Dixon Le Plongeon (1851–1910) was an English photographer, amateur archeologist, traveller, and author. She was one of the first people to excavate and study the ancient Maya sites of Chichen Itza and Uxmal.

== Early life ==
Alice Dixon was born in London on 12 December 1851. She was the second of nine children born to Henry Dixon and Sophia Cook. Henry Dixon was a copper-plate printer who later became a successful photographer. Henry Dixon was recognized in the late nineteenth century for his contribution to the development of panchromatic photography and for his photos of London architecture taken for the Society for Photographing Relics of Old London. Alice learned the principles of photography from her father and worked as an assistant at his studio.

Another member of the family who had a strong influence on Alice was her uncle, Dr. Jacob Dixon. Dr. Dixon practiced Spiritualism and Alice became involved in the Spiritualist movement in England at a young age. 1871, Alice participated in a séance at her Uncle's home. In her memoirs Alice reports that at this séance a spirit predicted that she would be married before she was twenty and that she would move very far from England.

Later the same year Alice met Augustus Le Plongeon while he was in London studying Mexican and Maya artifacts at the British Museum. After she first met Augustus, Alice told her mother, "Mother, while I was out today I met him who I know that I shall have to marry by and by." Twenty-five years her senior, Augustus Le Plongeon was a French-American photographer and amateur archeologist who had already traveled and worked in Chile, California, and Peru. He was in London to prepare for a trip into the jungles of Yucatán. Alice grew interested in ancient Maya civilization, studied John L. Stephen's Incidents of Travel in Yucatan, and agreed to join Augustus on his expedition. Alice and Augustus, not yet married, traveled from London to New York to complete the last of their preparations.

== Career ==
The couple married in New York before traveling to Mexico in 1873. After arriving in Mérida, Alice Dixon Le Plongeon became seriously ill with yellow fever. Augustus nursed her back to health, and they stayed in Mérida while she regained her strength. The pair became acquainted with local scholars and learned to speak Yucatec Maya. Their first trip out of Mérida was a short visit to Uxmal, where they explored the site and took some photographs.

The Le Plongeons were in Yucatán during the years of the Caste War, a conflict between the Maya, called the Chan Santa Cruz, and the army of Yucatán. In 1875, they left Mérida and traveled to Chichen Itza with a military escort, who was assigned to stay with the archeologists while they worked.

When out in the field, the Le Plongeons practiced archeology by taking numerous photographs, sketching drawings and maps, making molds of bas-reliefs, and digging excavation tunnels to explore buildings. Their photography equipment consisted of two Scovill Manufacturing Company view cameras with an assortment of lenses. They took a variety of photographs, including 3D stereo images, which were developed in a darkroom set up on site. In addition to the detachment of soldiers, the Le Plongeons hired local Maya men to cut back the vegetation and clear growth from the site. The whole crew faced illness and hunger, heat, insects, and other dangerous wildlife.

In addition to exploring the sites of Chichen Itza and Uxmal, Alice and her husband worked around the city of Mérida, and at Mayapan. In 1878 they traveled south to British Honduras before financial difficulties forced them to return to the United States to solicit sponsorship.

From 1880 to 1884 the Le Plongeons spent time in Mexico City and continued their work at sites in Yucatán. During this time, they made a few trips back to New York when their finances were strained. Among their sponsors was cigarette manufacturer Pierre Lorillard and Phoebe Hearst. When in New York the couple gave lectures on their work and attempted to sell their bas-relief molds to museums and collectors.

== Findings and theories ==
By studying the murals and statues at Chichen Itza, Augustus and Alice developed theories about the past Maya rulers and the influence of the Maya. They pieced together a narrative of an ancient Maya ruler named Queen Moo (from the Maya word for macaw) and her brother and consort Prince Coh, sometimes called Prince Chaacmol (named for the Maya words chaac and mol, meaning powerful warrior). Throughout their careers, the Le Plongeons would expand on their theories. Eventually, they came to believe the ancient Maya had helped found ancient Egyptian civilization as well as the lost civilization of Atlantis.

In November 1875 the Le Plongeons unearthed a large statue from near the Platform of the Eagles and Jaguars at Chichen Itza. The statue was of a reclining man and the Le Plongeons believed it was a representation of Prince Chaacmol. So, the statue was named Chacmool and was lauded by the American Geographical Society as a great archeological find. Other artifacts were found near the statue including flint, ceramic pieces, and a piece of jadeite that Augustus had set in a gold brooch. Alice would keep and wear this talisman for the rest of her life.

== Life in New York ==
In 1884 the Le Plongeons left Mexico and settled in New York. There, Alice focused on her writing and giving lectures. She published articles and organized her field notes. Alice also became involved in a number of social movements. She was a member of Sorosis, a professional women's organization. She also gave lectures to fund raise for the New York Diet Kitchen Association, an organization which aimed to fed the poor. Alice had a strong interest in Spiritualism, Freemasonry, and the Rosicrucians, and was active in the Theosophical Society.

The archeological community was not welcoming to the Le Plongeon's theories about Queen Moo. Alice wrote that she was "bitterly indignant" about the lack of recognition for her and her husband's work. Despite these critics the pair continued to write and lecture on their findings. In 1886 Alice published Here and There in Yucatan and in 1902 her epic poem Queen Moo's Talisman was published. She also wrote about the Maya establishing the ancient civilization of Atlantis in A Dream of Atlantis, which was published in serial form in The World Magazine, a Theosophy serial, from 1909 to 1911.

Augustus Le Plongeon experienced declining health in the summer of 1908. Alice spent much of her time attending to his needs before he died in December of that year. Alice continued to write and give lectures after her husband's death but became ill and was diagnosed with breast cancer in February 1910. She died on 8 June at New York Women's Hospital.

== Works ==
- Here and There in Yucatan (1886)

Subjects - Places	Country	Year	Other Information	Image
Chichen Itza	Mexico	1873 - 1883		
Pyramid of the Magician	Mexico	1876		
