= The Hardships of the English Laws in Relation to Wives =

18th century legal treatise

- Edition of the Hardships in the collection of the Bodleian Library
- Author: Sarah Chapone
- Language: English
- Subject: Coverture
- Published: 1735
- Publisher: William Bowyer and J. Roberts at Oxford Arms, Warwick Lane, London; The Gentleman's Magazine (in extended excerpts); some editions bound by Birdsall & Son
- Publication place: England
- ISBN: 9781317029281 (identifies a 2018 scholarly edition of the Hardships, not the original 1735 edition)
- OCLC: 27309566
- LC Class: KD758 .C43 1735
- Text: The Hardships of the English Laws in Relation to Wives at Wikisource

The Hardships of the English Laws in Relation to Wives: With an Explanation of the Original Curse of Subjection Passed upon the Woman: In an Humble Address to the Legislature (1735) is a legal treatise by Sarah Chapone on the oppression of married women, styled as an address to Parliament. It was originally published anonymously, but scholarship has confirmed that Chapone was the author.

The Hardships, which was written at a time of political crisis in England, argues that the position of married women under the legal doctrine of coverture was analogous to slavery. Present-day scholars have noted philosophical analogies with republican theory and currents of Christian feminism in the work.

== Historical background ==
The Hardships was composed in the wake of the Excise Crisis of 1733. The controversy involved customs duties imposed at the instance of Robert Walpole, who hoped to reduce land taxes (disfavoured by the gentry, who were the majority of MPs at the time) by making up the shortfall with tariffs imposed on tobacco imports. This change met with fierce opposition.

During the Crisis, political pamphleteers had argued that if one's property—and, hence, one's person—were subject to interference by another, one was not free. Broad suggests that these pamphlets, and the views of liberty they introduced, should be understood as part of the conceptual background to the Hardships.

== Publication history ==
Hardships was originally published anonymously in London in 1735. Scholars have confirmed that Chapone was the author. Portions of the work were reprinted in The Gentleman's Magazine in 1741.

== Argument ==
Chapone outlines the argument at the beginning of Hardships in three propositions:

I. That the Estate of Wives is more disadvantagious [sic] than Slavery itself.

II. That Wives may be made Prisoners for Life at the Discretion of their Domestic Governors, whose Power … bears no Manner of Proportion to that Degree of Authority, which is vested in any other set of Men in England. …

III. That Wives have no Property, neither in their own Persons, Children, or Fortunes.

== Commentary ==
=== As a legal treatise ===
The Hardships is an argument against coverture and other forms of oppression. Chapone canvasses both English law and foreign equivalents, arguing that English law in the mid-18th century put women in a less favourable position than either Roman or Portuguese law. (Note: For a present-day discussion of one of the cases Chapone discusses in Hardships, and for broader discussion of the abuse of women in the 18th century, see Bailey, Joanne (2006). "'I Dye [sic] by Inches': Locating Wife Beating in the Concept of a Privatization of Marriage and Violence in Eighteenth-Century England". Social History. 31 (3): 280. doi:10.1080/03071020600763615. ISSN 0307-1022. JSTOR 4287361. S2CID 144419632.) Her discussion of Portuguese law, which, at the time, was relatively progressive with regard to women's rights, was unusual. Generally speaking, non-Lusophone works did not consider Portuguese sources.

Chapone suggests that English wives were more oppressed than members of a harem. She argues that the law permits husbands to treat their wives essentially as they wish, without fear of legal consequence, and advocates for 'just and reasonable safeguards for a married woman's personal property and property in her children'. She placed a particular emphasis on this latter point.

It is not clear whether the Hardships paints an accurate portrait of women's legal situation in England in the mid-18th century. Bailey notes that, while the common law doctrine of coverture was deeply limiting, '[t]hree other jurisdictions – equity, ecclesiastical law and customary law – gave women individual rights, redress and opportunities for litigation'.

=== As philosophy and protofeminist theory ===
Broad argues that the Hardships develops a 'republican concept of liberty', according to which women should be both free from domination in the marital context and free to develop their own personalities free from undue interference.

Orr argues that Anglican theology was an influence on the Hardships. She notes (following Barbara J. Todd) that Patrick Delany's text Revelation Examined with Candour (1732) was in the background of Chapone's work, and that Jeremy Taylor's views on marriage were likely also important to the theory of the Hardships.

Orr further claims that 'the theological framework is essential for understanding Chapone's feminism'. She suggests that, on Chapone's view, any threat to the status of Christianity in society—such as that posed by Deism, which Chapone also critiqued in her Remarks on Mrs. Muilman's Letter to the Right Honourable the Earl of Chesterfield (1750)—would induce husbands to abandon a Christian attitude towards their wives, and thereby indulge in the worst excesses that the English law allowed.

In the Hardships, Chapone critiques the sexist views of William Wollaston, who argued that women were naturally inferior to men. She also expresses dissatisfaction with the theory of Thomas Hobbes.

== Bibliography ==
- Andrea, Bernadette (16 March 2009). "Islam, Women, and Western Responses: The Contemporary Relevance of Early Modern Investigations". Women's Studies. 38 (3): 273–292. doi:10.1080/00497870902724612. ISSN 0049-7878. S2CID 143613596.
- Bailey, Joanne (December 2002). "Favoured or Oppressed? Married Women, Property and 'Coverture' in England, 1660–1800". Continuity and Change. 17 (3): 351–372. doi:10.1017/S0268416002004253. ISSN 0268-4160. PMID 17387826. S2CID 11354509.
- Broad, Jacqueline (January 2015). ""A Great Championess for Her Sex": Sarah Chapone on Liberty as Nondomination and Self-Mastery". The Monist. 98 (1): 77–88. doi:10.1093/monist/onu009. ISSN 0026-9662. JSTOR 44012715.
- Chapone, Sarah (1735). The Hardships of the English Laws in Relation to Wives. London: William Bowyer and J. Roberts.
- Eaves, T. C. Duncan; Kimpel, Ben (1971). Samuel Richardson: A Biography. Oxford: Clarendon Press. ISBN 978-0-19-812431-3. OCLC 31889992 – via Internet Archive.
- Orr, Clarissa Campbell (3 March 2016). "The Sappho of Gloucestershire: Sarah Chapone and Christian Feminism". In Heller, Deborah (ed.). Bluestockings Now!: The Evolution of a Social Role. London: Routledge. doi:10.4324/9781315569581. ISBN 978-1-315-56958-1.
- Todd, Barbara J. (1998). ""To be some body": Married women and The Hardships of the English Laws". In Smith, Hilda L. (ed.). Women Writers and the Early Modern British Political Tradition. Cambridge: Cambridge University Press. pp. 343–362. doi:10.1017/cbo9780511558580.022. ISBN 978-0-521-58509-5.
