= Royal Victoria Hospital, Folkestone =

Royal Victoria Hospital
- East Kent Hospitals University NHS Foundation Trust
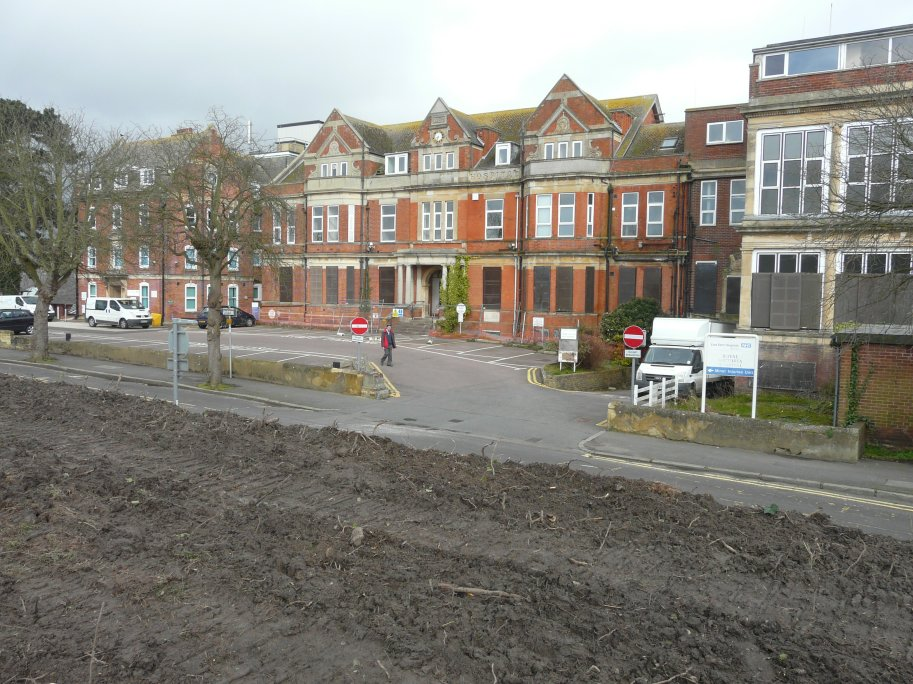
- Royal Victoria Hospital

- Shown in Kent

Geography
- Location: Folkestone, England, United Kingdom
- Coordinates: 51.0861°N 1.1716°E

Organisation
- Care system: Public NHS

Services
- Emergency department: No Accident & Emergency

History
- Founded: 1846

Links
- Website: www.ekhuft.nhs.uk/patients-and-visitors/royal-victoria-hospital/
- Lists: Hospitals in England

The Royal Victoria Hospital, Folkestone, is a community hospital located on the edge of Radnor Park in Folkestone, Kent, in England. It is managed by the East Kent Hospitals University NHS Foundation Trust.

== History ==
The hospital opened on Rendezvous Street in Folkestone as the Folkestone Dispensary in 1846. The name was expanded to Folkestone Dispensary and Infirmary and it relocated to a site on Dover Road in Folkestone in 1863. The current general hospital buildings were constructed on Radnor Park Avenue, and opened in 1890, when the name was again changed, this time to the Victoria Hospital. The prefix Royal was added in 1910.

In the 1970s, services were scaled down, with the focusing of regional hospital care in East Kent on the town of Ashford, Kent. In 1973 maternity services were moved to Ashford's Willesborough Hospital. In 1979 the new William Harvey Hospital opened in Ashford (ironically, named after Folkestone's William Harvey), and many other services were transferred here over the following years. The accident and emergency department at Royal Victoria Hospital was closed at that time, leaving it with a minor injuries service.

== Current operation ==
The hospital is the base for a large general practice and, although the accident and emergency department has closed, there is still an operational minor injuries unit. The hospital provides gynaecological, otorhinolaryngological and urological outpatient services, diagnostic services, mental health care, and general outpatient facilities.

The hospital has a day-time walk-in centre for non-critical patients without appointments, financed in part from a £2 million Government grant in 2014.

== See also ==
- Healthcare in Kent
- List of hospitals in England
