= Chapone =

Chapone is a surname. Notable people with the surname include:

- Hester Chapone (1727–1801), English conduct writer
- Sarah Chapone (1699–1764), English legal theorist
