= Society for Photographing Relics of Old London =

British organization (1875–1886)

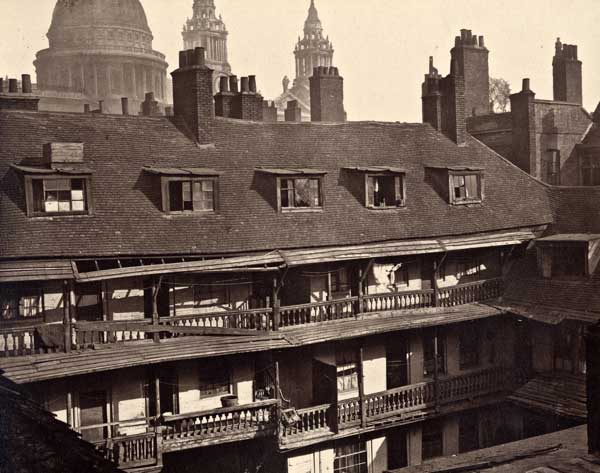
One of the society's photos of the Oxford Arms, which started the project

The Society for Photographing Relics of Old London was founded in 1875 in London, England, initially with the purpose of recording the Oxford Arms, a traditional galleried public house on Warwick Lane that was to be demolished as part of the redevelopment of the Old Bailey.

Alfred & John Bool took the photographs, and when the project was announced in a letter to The Times, the news received such a positive response that the society's work was continued, with a total of twelve issues being produced over twelve years, containing a total of 120 photographs.

The photographs were commissioned to preserve an architectural record of buildings, some of which were built before the Great Fire of London in 1666, and which were scheduled for demolition as part of the city's urban redevelopment measures at the end of the 19th century. It was important to choose a photographic technique that would last for generations.

In 1870, the pigment printing process was invented. Society member Henry Dixon mastered the process, and the photographic images are still of excellent technical quality today. The group continued to document the old buildings of London threatened with demolition until its dissolution in 1886.

== List of photographs ==
The 120 photographs published by the group over its lifetime were titled:

1. Entrance of the 'Oxford Arms' Inn
2. 'Oxford Arms' Inn
3. Entrance of the 'Oxford Arms' Inn
4. Upper Gallery of the 'Oxford Arms' Inn
5. One of the staircases at the 'Oxford Arms' Inn
6. General view of the galleries at the 'Oxford Arms' Inn (originally issued 1875)
7. Old houses in Wych Street
8. Old houses in Wych Street
9. Old houses in Drury Lane
10. Old houses in Drury Lane
11. Lincoln's Inn Gate House
12. Lincoln's Inn: Old Square (originally issued 1876)
13. Churchyard of St Bartholomew, Smithfield, London
14. Churchyard of St Bartholomew, Smithfield
15. Green Churchyard, St Bartholomew, Smithfield
16. Window at the east end of St Bartholomew, Smithfield
17. North side and 'Poors Churchyard' at St Bartholomew, Smithfield
18. North side and 'Poors Churchyard' at St Bartholomew, Smithfield (originally issued 1877)
19. Temple Bar
20. 102 Leadenhall Street
21. Old houses in Gray's Inn Road
22. Shop in Brewer Street, Soho
23. The Sir Paul Pindar, Bishopsgate Street
24. Old house in Holborn / Staple Inn, Holborn front (originally issued 1878)
25. Canonbury Tower
26. Canonbury Tower
27. Barnard's Inn
28. Barnard's Inn
29. Barnard's Inn
30. Old houses in Aldergate Street
31. Old houses in Aldergate Street
32. Shaftesbury House, Aldersgate Street
33. Christ's Hospital
34. Christ's Hospital
35. Churchyard of St.Lawrence Pountney
36. Old houses in Great Queen Street (originally issued 1879)
37. General view from Charterhouse Square
38. Charterhouse: Washhouse Court
39. Charterhouse: Washhouse Court
40. Charterhouse: The Cloisters
41. Charterhouse: The Great Hall
42. Charterhouse: The Great Hall
43. Charterhouse: The Great Hall
44. Charterhouse: The Great Hall
45. Charterhouse: The Grand Staircase
46. Charterhouse: The Governor's Room
47. Charterhouse: Entrance to the Chapel
48. Charterhouse: Founder's Tomb (originally issued 1880)
49. King's Head Inn yard
50. King's Head Inn yard
51. White Hart Inn yard
52. White Hart Inn yard
53. George Inn yard
54. Queen's Head Inn yard
55. Queen's Head Inn yard
56. Old houses in Borough High Street, Southwark
57. St Mary Overy's Dock
58. Old houses in Bermondsey Street
59. Sion College, London Wall
60. Oxford Market (originally issued 1881)
61. Little Dean's Yard
62. Ashburnham House: Exterior
63. Ashburnham House: The Staircase
64. Ashburnham House: The Staircase
65. Ashburnham House: The Ante-room
66. Ashburnham House: The Dining Room
67. Ashburnham House: The Garden
68. Banqueting House, Whitehall
69. The Water Gate of York House
70. Lincoln's Inn Fields
71. Lincoln's Inn Fields
72. Lincoln's Inn Fields (originally issued 1882)
73. Lambeth Palace: The Gate House
74. Lambeth Palace: The Great Hall
75. Lambeth Palace: The Lollards' Tower
76. Old House, Palace Yard, Lambeth
77. Old houses, Aldgate
78. Old houses, Aldgate
79. 'The Golden Axe', St Mary Axe
80. No.37 Cheapside
81. No.73 Cheapside ("Old Mansion House")
82. Old house, Great Ormond Street
83. Old house, Queen Square, Bloomsbury
84. Shop, Macclesfield Street, Soho (originally issued 1883)
85. Old houses, Fleet Street
86. The 'Old Bell', Holborn
87. The 'Old Bell', Holborn
88. St Giles, Cripplegate
89. Old house, Fore Street
90. Old house, Great Winchester Street
91. Austin Friars
92. Staircase of Austin-Friars
93. Doorways, Laurence Pountney Hill
94. College Street
95. Innholders' Hall
96. Doorway, College Hill (issued 1884)
97. Inner Temple
98. Inner Temple
99. Inner Temple
100. Middle Temple
101. Middle Temple
102. Middle Temple
103. Gray's Inn
104. Gray's Inn
105. Clement's Inn: Garden House
106. Clifford's Inn
107. Staple Inn Hall
108. Six small subjects (originally issued 1885)
109. St John's Gate, Clerkenwell
110. Old houses in The Strand
111. Great St Helen's, Bishopsgate Street
112. Tennis Court, James Street, Haymarket
113. Emanuel Hospital, Westminster
114. Queen Anne's Gate
115. Chimney-piece, Sessions House, Clerkenwell
116. Chimney-piece, Court House, St Andrew's, Holborn
117. Chimney-piece, Tallow Chandler's Hall
118. Court room, New River Company
119. Three doorways
120. Five small subjects (missing) (issued 1886)

== Gallery ==
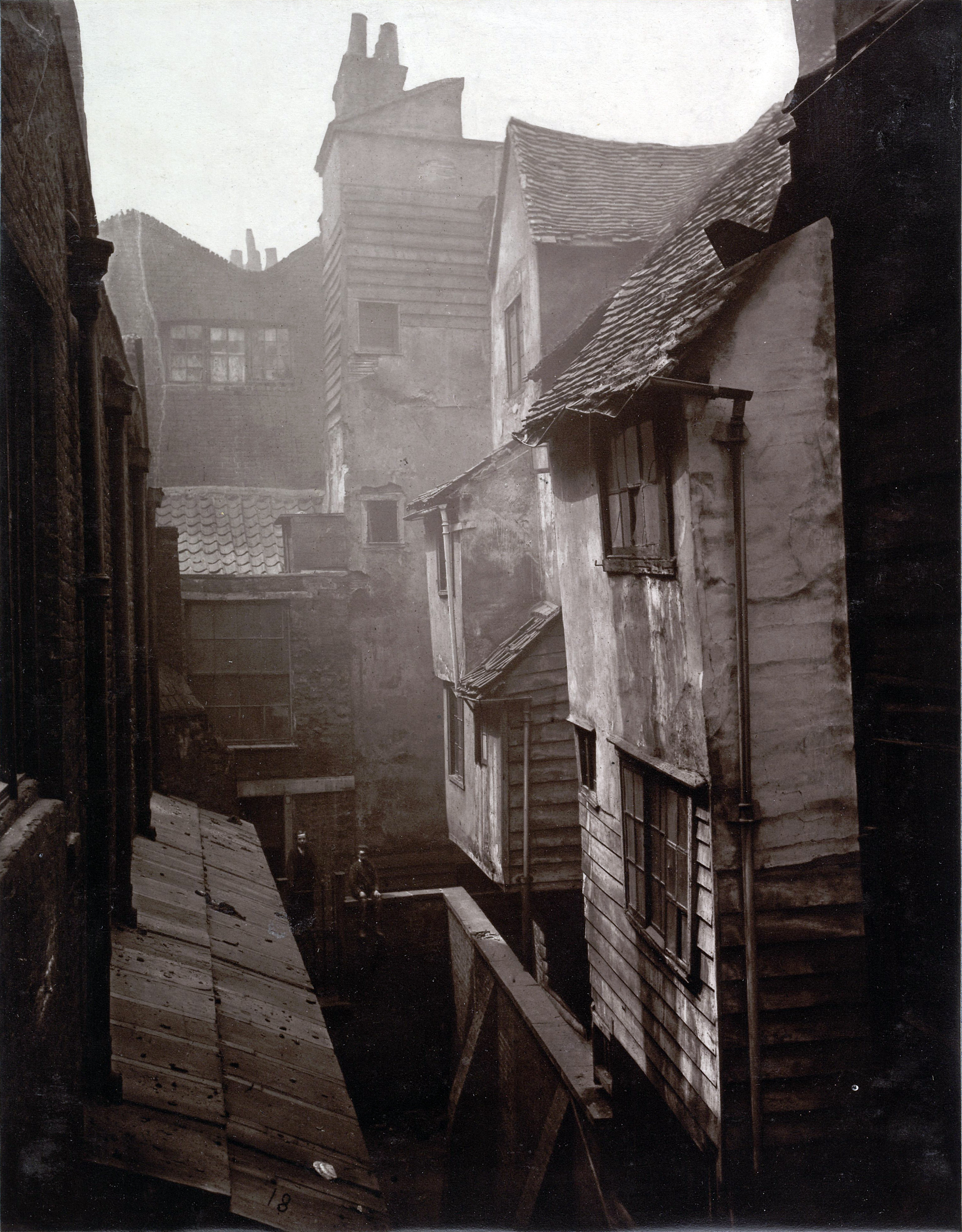
Cloth Fair

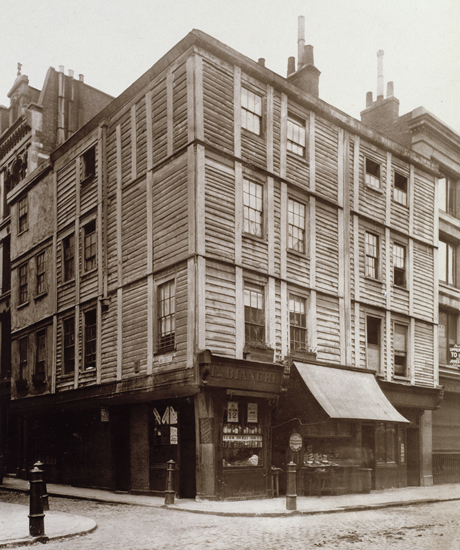
Fore Street

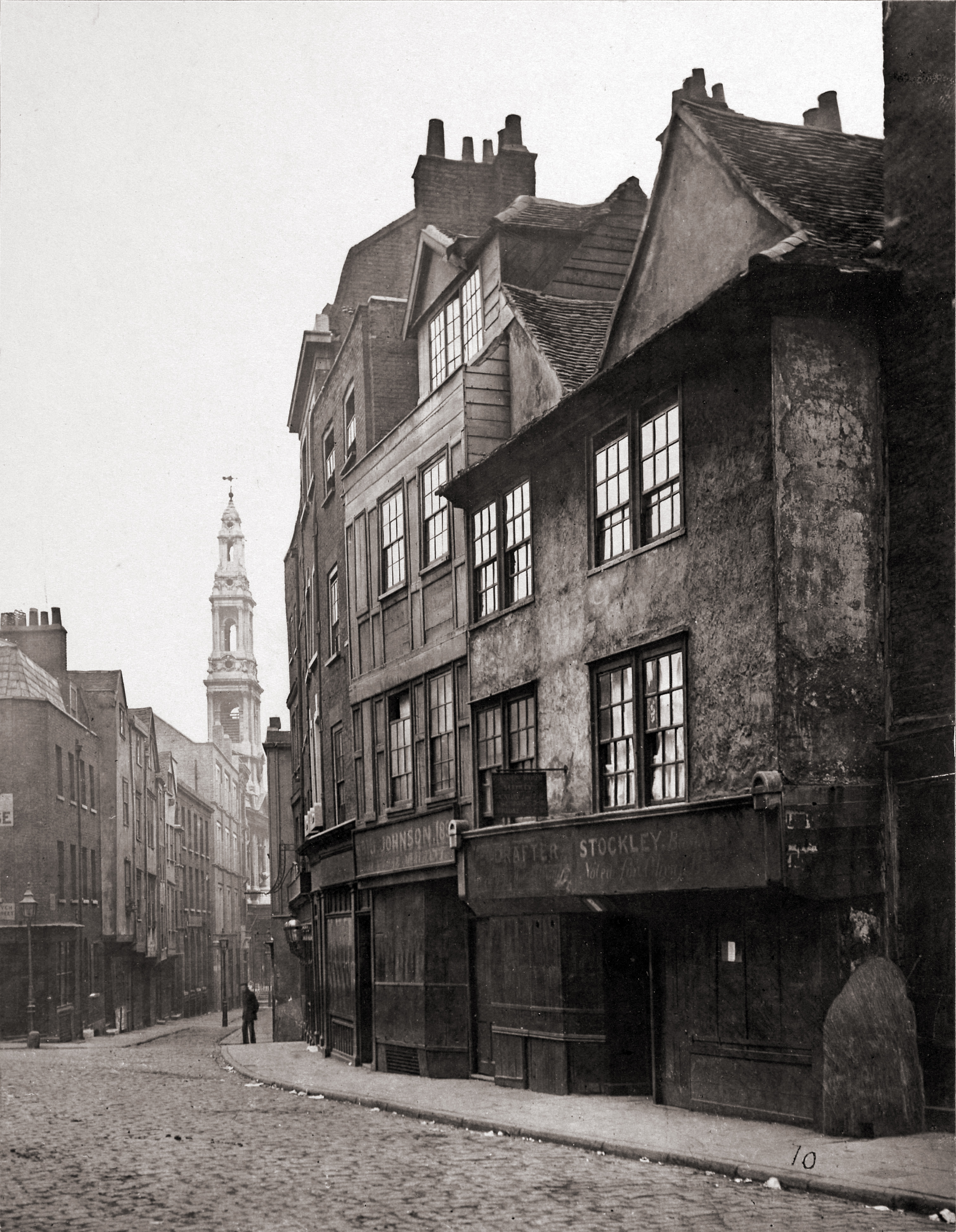
Drury Lane

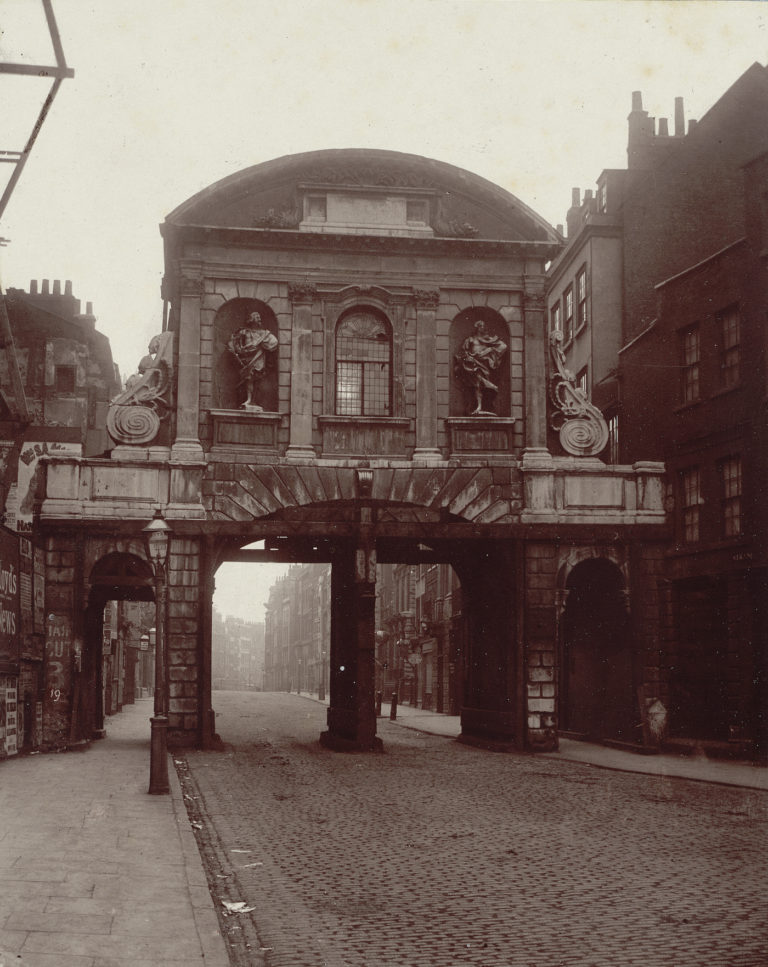
Temple Bar

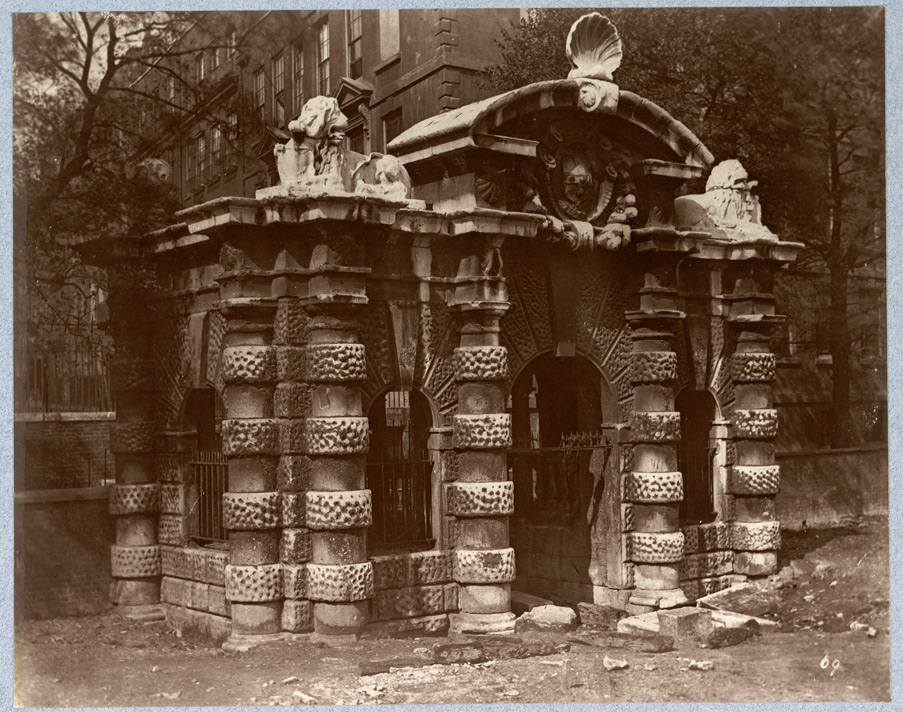
The Water Gate of York House

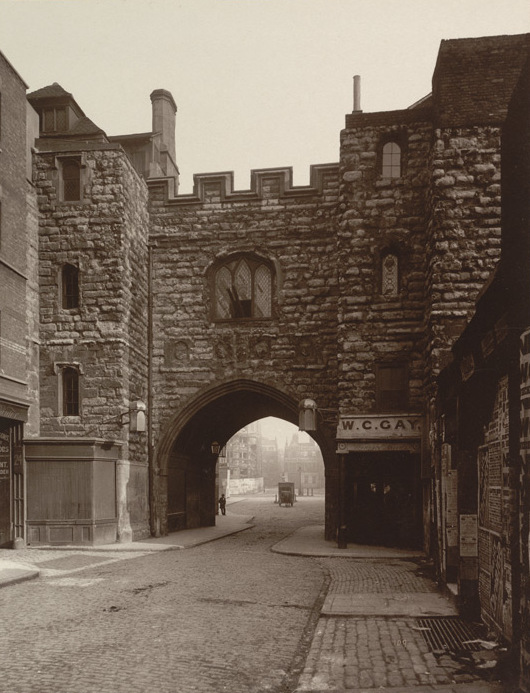
Saint John's Gate, Clerkenwell

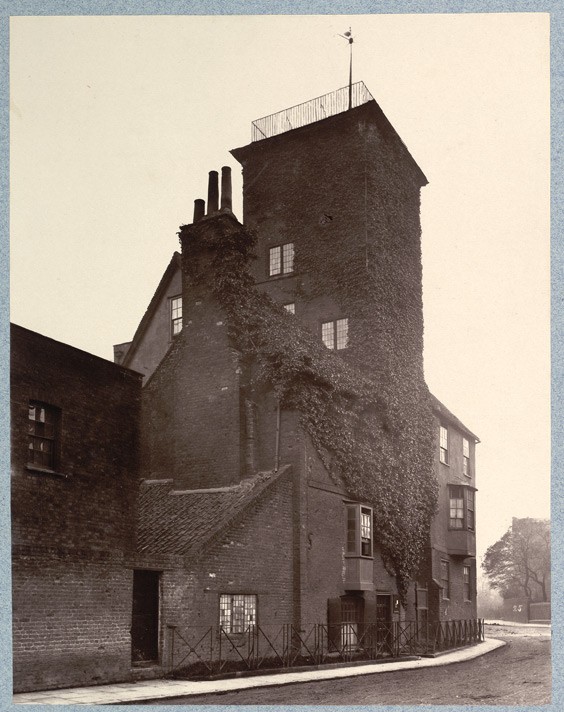
Canonbury Tower

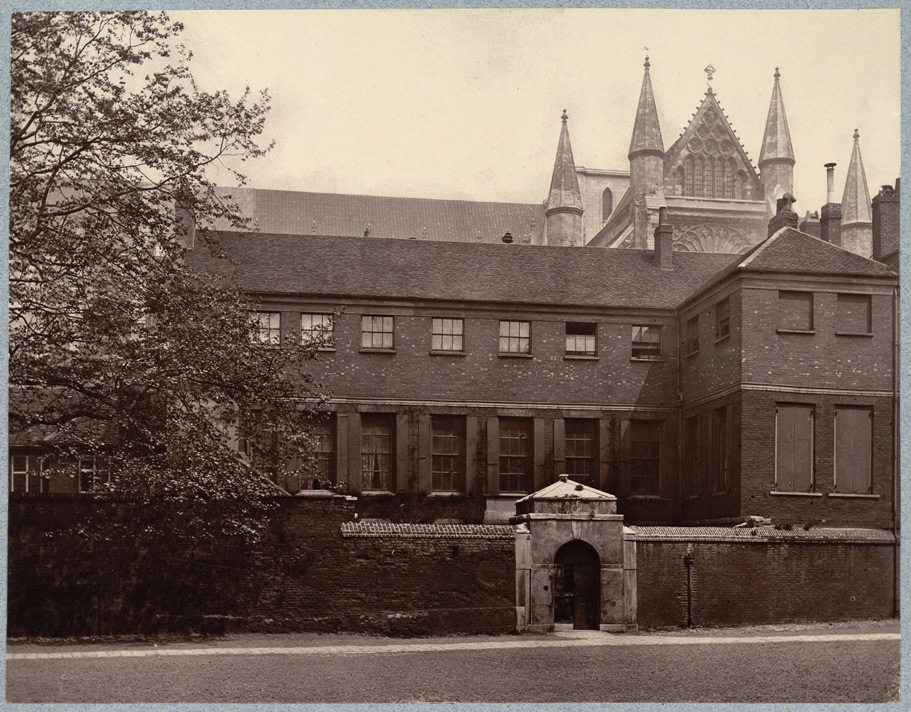
Ashburnham House
