= Queen Elizabeth The Queen Mother Hospital =

- East Kent Hospitals University NHS Foundation Trust
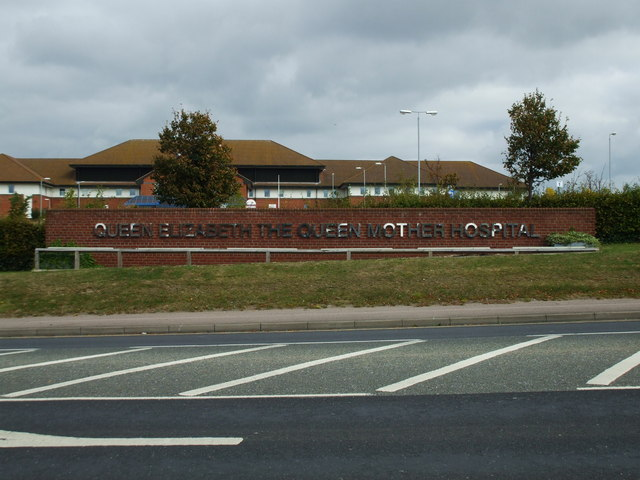
- Queen Elizabeth The Queen Mother Hospital

Geography
- Location: Margate, Kent, England
- Coordinates: 51.3751°N 1.3875°E

Organisation
- Care system: National Health Service
- Type: General

Services
- Emergency department: Yes

History
- Founded: 1930s

Links
- Website: www.ekhuft.nhs.uk/qeqm/

The Queen Elizabeth The Queen Mother Hospital (QEQM) is a hospital in Margate, Kent, England. It is managed by the East Kent Hospitals University NHS Foundation Trust.

== History ==
The hospital has its origins in the Margate Cottage Hospital which was established at Victoria Road in Margate in 1876. In the 1920s it was decided to relocate the hospital to its current site in St Peters Road. The new facility was opened by Prince and Princess Arthur of Connaught as the Margate and District General Hospital in July 1930.

The hospital joined the National Health Service as the Margate General Hospital in 1948 and then became the Isle of Thanet District Hospital, Margate Wing in 1973 before becoming Thanet District General Hospital in 1986. In 1965 a new maternity wing was named after Edith Greaves OBE, a midwife and matron of City of London Maternity Hospital for over 32 years. A major new extension was opened by Charles, Prince of Wales on behalf of Queen Elizabeth the Queen Mother in 1996 at which time the hospital was renamed the Queen Elizabeth The Queen Mother Hospital.
