= Kent and Canterbury Hospital =

- East Kent Hospitals University NHS Foundation Trust
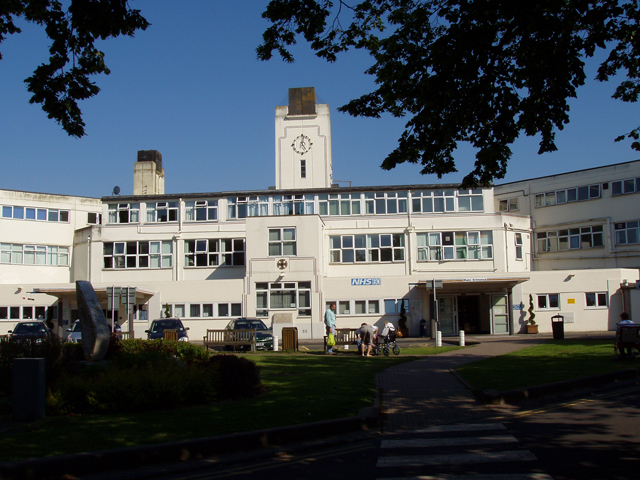
- Kent and Canterbury Hospital

- Shown in Kent

Geography
- Location: Canterbury, Kent, England
- Coordinates: 51.2664°N 1.0884°E

Organisation
- Care system: National Health Service
- Type: Community Hospital

Services
- Emergency department: No

History
- Founded: 1793

Links
- Website: www.ekhuft.nhs.uk
- Lists: Hospitals in England

The Kent and Canterbury Hospital, colloquially known among residents as the K+C, is a community hospital in Canterbury, Kent, England. It is managed by the East Kent Hospitals University NHS Foundation Trust.

== History ==
After a suitable site on land formerly belonging to St Augustine's Abbey had been identified, the foundation stone for the Kent and Canterbury Infirmary was laid by Sir Edward Knatchbull in June 1791. It was completed in September 1793 and extended in 1829, 1838 and 1871.

The present hospital, which was designed in the Art Deco style, was opened by the Duke of Kent in 1937. The hospital joined the National Health Service in 1948 and the gynecology department of the hospital moved to Higham Park in 1951 where it would remain for some 30 years. The hospital was considerably expanded in the 1960s.
