= Edith Greaves =

Edith Elizabeth Greaves
- Born: 2 November 1879; Martley, Worcestershire
- Died: 1967 (aged 87–88)
- Education: The London Hospital
- Occupations: Midwife and midwifery leader

Edith Elizabeth Greaves, OBE was a nurse, midwife, midwifery leader and matron of City of London Maternity Hospital from 1912 to 1944. She was appointed by the Ministry of Health to the Central Midwives' Board, and was a member of the Council of the College of Midwives.

== Early life ==
Greaves was born in 1879 in Worcester to Walter, a farmer, and his wife Elizabeth. Edith was the oldest of at least five daughters. By the time she was 21 her father had died, and she was working as a hospital clerk. Greaves worked as assistant secretary at Birmingham Children's Hospital for over three years before she started nurse training.

== Career ==
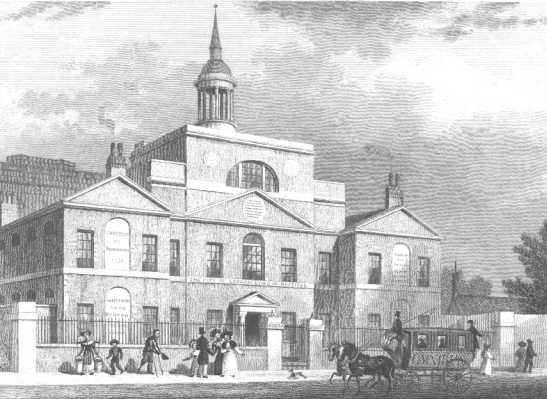
City of London Maternity Hospital

Greaves trained as a nurse at The London Hospital under Matron Eva Luckes between 1902 and 1906.

Following completion of her training, she trained as a midwife at The London, and worked as a staff nurse, midwifery sister and nurse's home sister. Greaves applied for the matronship of Birmingham Infirmary, but Lückes 'had already recommended a candidate who had far more experience in general management than Edith Greaves'.

In 1912, Greaves was appointed as matron of the City of London Maternity Hospital. She held the post for at least 32 years. The hospital was hit during air raids during World War Two, and Greaves helped supervise its relocation to Brocket Hall in Hertfordshire.

She was a member of the Council for the College of Midwives, and the Central Midwives Board.

== Honours ==
Greaves was appointed an MBE in June 1933.

Greaves was appointed an OBE in 1944 for her services to midwifery.

== Retirement and death ==
Greaves retired after 1946, and moved to Kent. She was on Margate Hospital Management Committee for nine years.

A local maternity department at Margate Hospital (now the Queen Elizabeth The Queen Mother Hospital) was named the Edith Greaves Maternity Unit in 1965, in recognition of her 'lifelong association with midwifery'.

Greaves died on 2 October 1967.
