= Alfred & John Bool =

19th-century British photographers

Alfred and John Bool were a pair of British brothers who photographed 19th-century London.

== Life and work ==
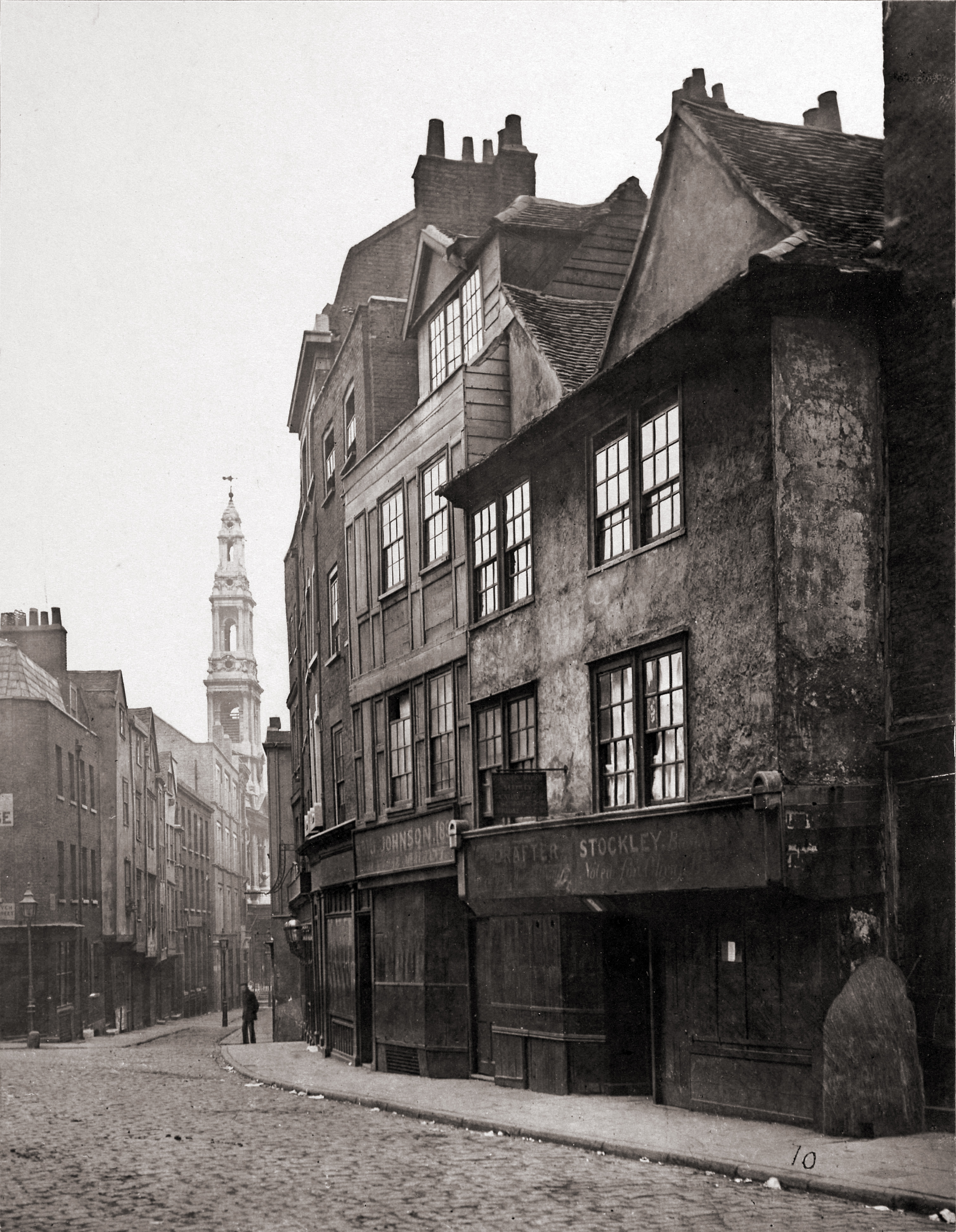
Drury Lane recorded by Henry Dixon and Alfred and John Bool, 1876

Alfred Henry Bool (1844–1926) and John James Bool (1850–1933) were both born in London. They opened a photo studio together in Pimlico in the 1860s, and John Bool worked there until 1918.

In 1875 the brothers were hired by Alfred Marks, the director of the Society for Photographing Relics of Old London, for whom they photographed numerous historic buildings including the Oxford Arms Inn, Lincoln's Inn, the Smithfield area, Temple Bar, Gray's Inn, St. Bartholomew's and the Cloth Fair. The album prints were made by the brothers in the company of Henry Dixon.

In 1977, works by Alfred & John Bool and Henry Dixon were shown at the documenta 6 art exhibition in Kassel, Germany.
