= Ann Newby =

English midwife and matron (1738–1813)

- Born: Ann Hobbs; 2 September 1739
- Died: March 1813 aged 74
- Occupation(s): Midwife and Matron
- Known for: Matron of the City of London Lying-In Hospital, Royal Humane Society gold medal recipient, certifying midwives
- Spouse: John Newby
- Children: Charles, Thomas, Sarah

Ann Newby (2 September 1738 – March 1813) was a midwife and matron of the City of London Lying-In Hospital for more than 40 years. She was awarded a medal from the Royal Humane Society for saving the lives of hundreds of newborn babies.

== Career ==
Ann Newby was assistant matron of the City of London Lying-In Hospital from 1769 and was made matron of the hospital on 3 November 1773, when the hospital received its license. Newby was one of the officers elected for life to the board of the hospital. She was the only woman.

In 1779, Newby co-signed Mary Burford's certificate to practise midwifery. This document is a rare survival.

Newby introduced a charity subscription from 1801 to help support patients leaving hospital with clothes, bedding, money or transportation.

In 1803, Newby was commended by the Royal Humane Society for her work to revive stillborn babies. She was credited with saving the lives of more than 500 infants. She was recommended for the award by doctors Sayer Walker and Richard Dennison, surgeon William Lucas and Reverend Colin Milne.

In 1805, it was reported in The Gentleman's Magazine that Newby's staff declined gratuities from patients' friends and family in order to prevent accusations that those who paid more received better care.

== Personal life ==
Ann Hobbs was born in September 1739 to Thomas and Ann Hobbs. She married John Newby, attorney at law from Holborn, in 1758.They had children including Charles (born 1760) Thomas (1767) and Sarah (1771).

== Death and legacy ==
Newby died in March 1813, aged 74, having been matron and midwife for 44 years and only recently retired. She left 2 guineas to assistant matron Catherine Widgeon and 100 guineas to the hospital.
