= Buckland Hospital =

- East Kent Hospitals University NHS Foundation Trust
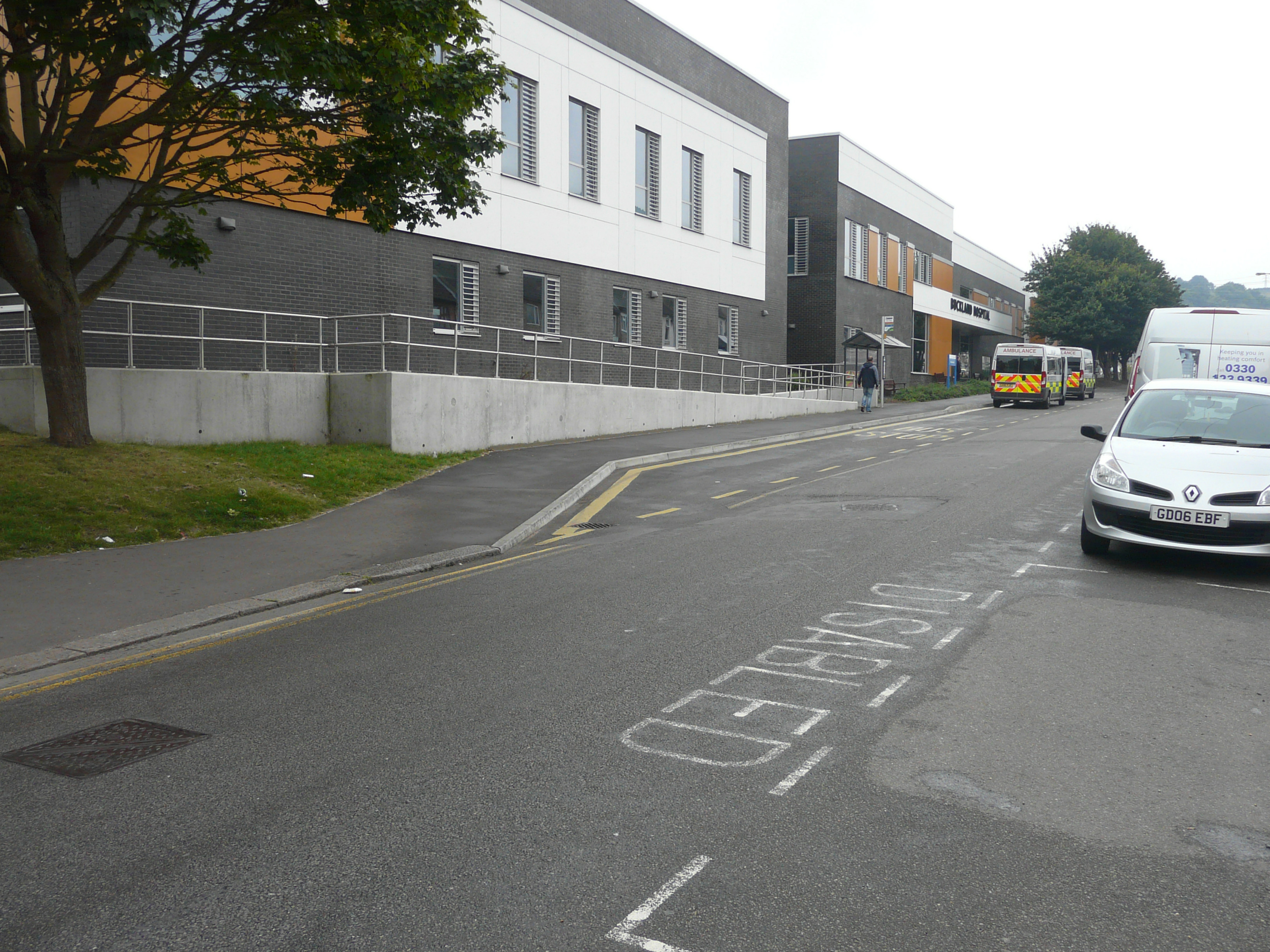
- Buckland Hospital

- Shown in Kent

Geography
- Location: Dover, Kent, England
- Coordinates: 51.1321°N 1.2922°E

Organisation
- Care system: National Health Service
- Type: Community Hospital

Services
- Emergency department: No

History
- Founded: 1836

Links
- Website: www.ekhuft.nhs.uk
- Lists: Hospitals in England

Buckland Hospital is a community hospital at Dover in Kent, England. It is managed by East Kent Hospitals University NHS Foundation Trust.

== History ==
The hospital has its origins in the Dover Union Workhouse Infirmary which was completed in 1836. This was replaced by a new infirmary in 1884 and a nurses' home was added in 1902. It became the county hospital in 1943 and it joined the National Health Service as Buckland Hospital in 1948. Funding for a purpose-built modern hospital on an adjacent site was approved in December 2012. The new hospital, which incorporates a minor injury unit, was completed in June 2015.

The site of the old hospital was bought by a developer for £1.5 million in December 2016.
