= Shaftesbury House, London =

Former house in London

Coordinates: 51.518702°N 0.096621°W

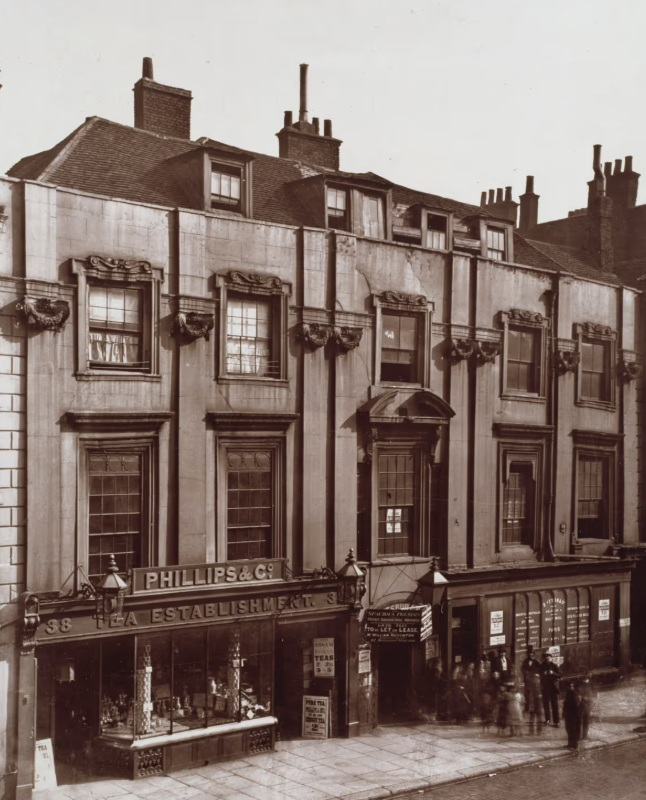
Shaftesbury House as photographed in 1879 by Henry Dixon

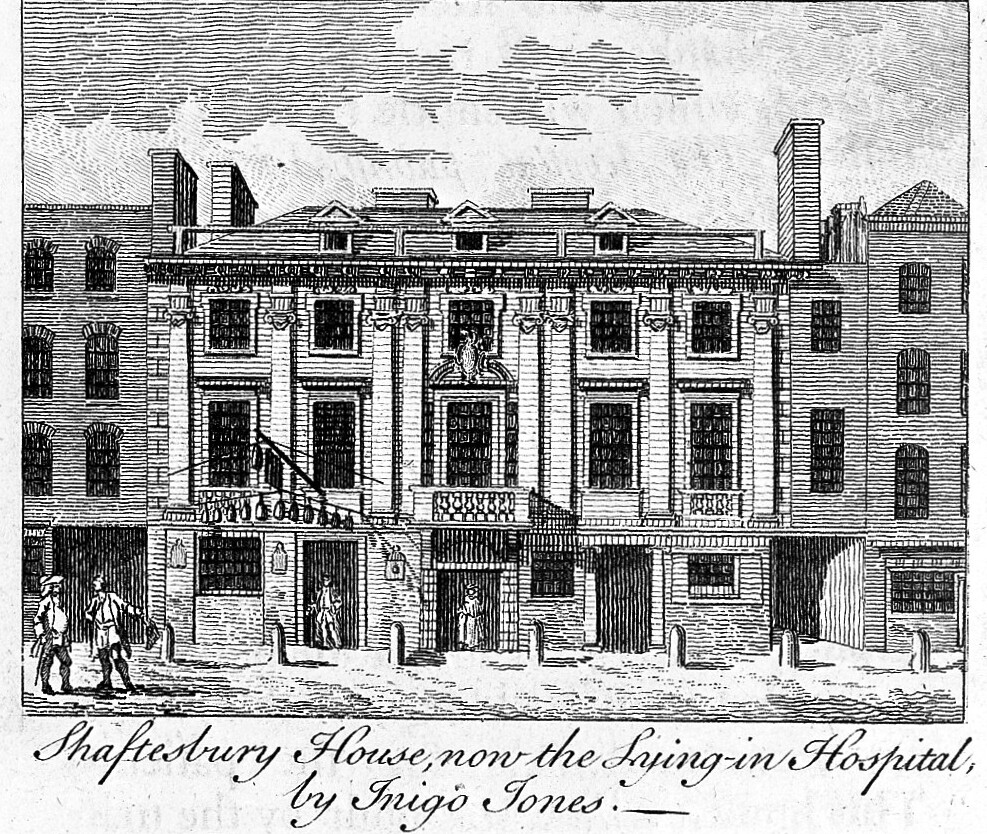
Engraving of Shaftesbury House

Shaftesbury House was a house at 35-38 Aldersgate Street built in 1644 and designed by Inigo Jones.

== History ==
The house was originally known as Thanet House, named for John Tufton the Earl of Thanet. Tufton would die at the house in 1664. The house would come under the ownership of Anthony Ashley Cooper, who later becoming 1st Earl of Shaftesbury would pass the title onto the house.

The house would continue to be used as a tavern, in 1750 it would become the City Lying-In Hospital, and later transformed into the first general dispensary in London. The house would be demolished in 1882.

There is a blue plaque on the site of the house.

== See also ==
- London House, Aldersgate Street
- Aldersgate
- Inigo Jones
