= East Kent Hospitals University NHS Foundation Trust =

NHS hospital trust in England

- Type: NHS foundation trust
- Established: 1 March 2009
- Headquarters: Canterbury, Kent, England
- Hospitals: Kent and Canterbury Hospital; William Harvey Hospital; Queen Elizabeth The Queen Mother Hospital; Buckland Hospital; Royal Victoria Hospital
- Staff: 9,338 WTE (2024/25)
- Website: www.ekhuft.nhs.uk

East Kent Hospitals University NHS Foundation Trust is one of the largest hospital trusts in England. It runs the Kent and Canterbury Hospital (Canterbury), William Harvey Hospital (Ashford), Queen Elizabeth The Queen Mother Hospital (Margate), Buckland Hospital (Dover), and the Royal Victoria Hospital (Folkestone) – and some outpatient facilities in the East Kent and Medway areas in England.

It serves a local population of around 759,000 people. It is a teaching trust involved in the education and training of doctors, nurses and other healthcare professionals, with King's College London and, since 2018, Kent and Medway Medical School.

== History ==
East Kent Hospitals NHS Trust was established on 1 April 1999, following the merger of three acute trusts in East Kent - The Kent and Canterbury Hospitals NHS Trust, The South Kent Hospitals NHS Trust and the Thanet Healthcare NHS Trust. The Trust was designated a University Hospital Trust on 1 August 2008, highlighting its commitment to training doctors, especially undergraduate medical students. The Trust achieved NHS foundation trust status on 1 March 2009.

== Development ==
The trust, with Maidstone and Tunbridge Wells NHS Trust was jointly procuring an electronic patient record system in a contract worth £10m – £40m in December 2013.

In April 2014 it was reported that the trust was looking for a partner to develop a private hospital at the William Harvey Hospital site and enhance the returns from the Spencer private hospital on the Queen Elizabeth The Queen Mother Hospital site with a contract over the next 15 to 15 years.

The trust's proposal to centralise surgery on the Canterbury site in order to manage problems caused by "the increasing sub-specialisation of surgery, the lack of availability of surgeons with skills that are essential to managing high risk and emergency general surgery, and the difficulty recruiting both permanent and locum medical staff" in May 2014 aroused opposition among consultants.

In May 2018 the trust announced plans to transfer 850 cleaning, catering, switchboard and portering staff who work for Serco and 250 NHS staff working on estates, procurement and facilities to a new limited company owned by the trust and described as a social enterprise. This organisation is named 2gether Support Solutions.

== Buildings ==
In August 2022 it was reported that the trust needed £65 million worth of improvements for critical risk infrastructure including the high voltage transformers at the Kent and Canterbury Hospital, high voltage upgrade works at the Queen Elizabeth, the Queen Mother, Hospital, replacement of obsolete fire alarm cabling and replacement of defective heat exchangers at the neonatal intensive care unit at the William Harvey Hospital. 8% of its estate was classified as bad, life expired and/or at serious risk of imminent failure.

== Performance ==
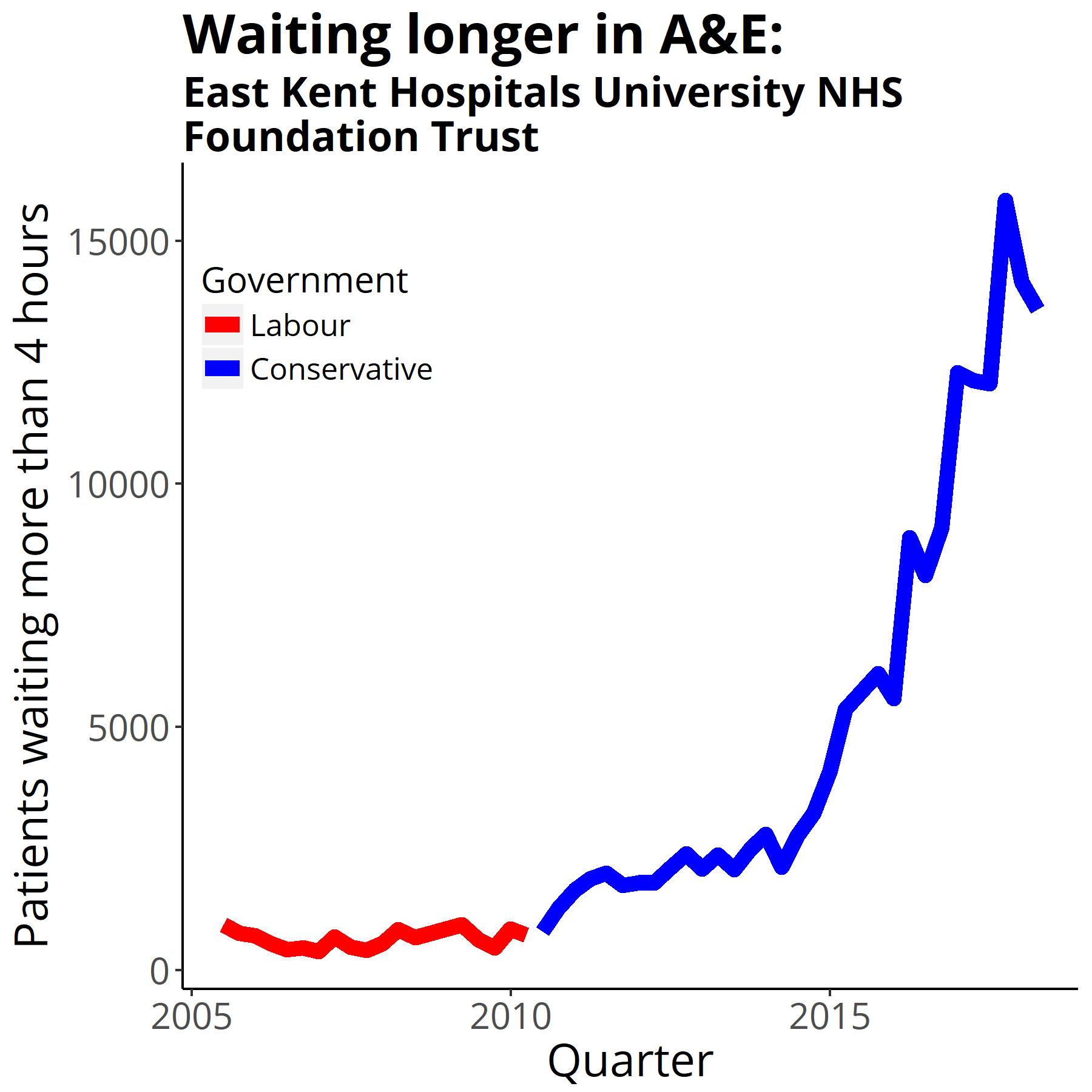
Four-hour target in the emergency department quarterly figures from NHS England

In 2010, it was named "Trust of the Year 2010" by the healthcare information organisation Dr Foster.

The trust was placed in special measures by Monitor (NHS) in September 2014 following an unfavourable report from the Care Quality Commission.

In 2015 the Trauma Audit & Research Network showed that the William Harvey Hospital in Ashford was the best performing hospital receiving trauma patients in England and Wales, out of 100 hospitals offering trauma facilities across the country, according to survival rates of patients. The Care Quality Commission upgraded the trust from "inadequate" to "requires improvement" and cited significant improvements. Two of the trust's five hospitals were rated as "Good". It was one of 26 responsible for half of the national growth in patients waiting more than four hours in accident and emergency over the 2014/5 winter. It hit controversy when an RAF sergeant was asked to leave the waiting room in case his uniform upset other patients. It admitted breaching a patient's human rights when it placed a "do not resuscitate" (DNR) order on the patients notes because the patient had learning difficulties. The trust had not consulted the family about the decision.

In 2016 the trust saw improvements in its annual Patient-Led Assessment in Care Environments audits, which were introduced nationally in 2013. All hospitals, hospices and day treatment centres that give NHS-funded care are subject to a PLACE inspection. In April 2016 it admitted that it could not cope with the overwhelming demand on its ophthalmology department, which saw nearly 100,000 patients in 2015/6. 7000 were in need of follow-up and at risk of deteriorating eyesight.

In October 2017 after months of very poor performance against the A&E four hour target it was clearly the worst performing trust in England on A&E in 2017–18, with around 30%t of patients waiting over four hours. The chair of the trust, Nikki Cole, resigned and was replaced by Peter Carter. In 2017–18 East Kent Hospitals saw 74.3% of A&E patients within four hours.

In August 2018 it announced that planned orthopaedic operations would be moved from the William Harvey Hospital to the Kent and Canterbury Hospital in an attempt to avoid cancellations.

In 2018 it had 214 estates and facilities related incidents. It runs more than 100 buildings, some of which date back to the 1930s, and appealed for £34 million in emergency capital funding in January 2019.

In September 2018, SERCO were sacked as the facilities provider for the Trust. They were replaced by 2gether Support Solutions, a brand new company, wholly owned by the Trust. 2Gether were given a 25 year contract and a loan of £100 million from the Trust. The deal was signed off by the then CEO Susan Acott and the then Chairman Steven Smith.

The trust commissioned 28 beds from a residential home, Ami Lodge in Deal, Kent, to support patients medically fit to leave hospital but not able to return to their own home. It was forced to abandon the scheme when the Care Quality Commission rated the home "inadequate" in November 2018.

=== Maternity deaths and Kirkup report ===
In January 2020, the inquest of baby Harry Richford revealed that he had died due to 7 gross failings which, the coroner said, amounted to neglect. This led to a public inquiry led by Dr Bill Kirkup. Well over 200 families came forward to have their own maternity cases examined by the inquiry.

In 2020 the BBC found 7 cases of babies either stillborn or who died shortly after birth since 2016, these cases should have been prevented with better care. The Royal College of Obstetricians and Gynaecologists found in 2015, consultants, failing to do labour ward rounds, failing to review women, make care plans or attend out of hours when asked, consultants, rarely did CTG training, and reportedly were, "doing their own thing rather than follow guidelines" Staff alleged at the review, the board did not consider maternity services a priority and no action would be taken over concerns raised. In 2014 the trust was put into special measures after Care Quality Commission rated its care, including maternity care inadequate. Since then the CQC rated it as requiring improvement.

From 2016 to 2019 the trust had to close one of its two maternity units, which are nearly 40 miles apart, to new births 111 times. At least 120 women in labour were diverted. Although it is not unusual for maternity units to close or divert for short periods these closures were unusually frequent.

In October 2020 the trust was prosecuted by the Care Quality Commission for failing to provide safe care and treatment exposing Harry Richford and his mother Sarah to avoidable harm. Harry died a week after his birth at Queen Elizabeth The Queen Mother Hospital in 2017. This is the first such prosecution of an acute trust. The trust were fined £1.1 million reduced to £733k following a guilty plea.

The families investigation into Harry's death was masterminded by Derek Richford, Harry's grandfather. The BBC said of the family's efforts "However, it took a skilled, determined, grieving family's fight for justice to force meaningful change on a reluctant and failing organisation." The story was covered nationally on all channels and later on the BBC website Michael Buchanan wrote Derek's story "No-one joined the dots".

Following two years of investigation into maternity services at East Kent Hospitals, a report named Reading the signals led by Dr Bill Kirkup was published on 19 October 2022. The review found that up to 45 babies may have survived if they had received better care. The report focused on the Trust's two maternity units, at the William Harvey Hospital in Ashford, and the Queen Elizabeth the Queen Mother Hospital in Margate.

In particular, when speaking of the seminal case, Harry Richford, Kirkup said - 1.112 This pattern of behaviour by the Trust, clearly evident in this case, recurred in many others that we examined. It included denying that anything had gone amiss, minimising adverse features, finding reasons to treat deaths and other catastrophic outcomes as expected, and omitting key details in accounts given to families as well as to official bodies. Although we did not find evidence that there was a conscious conspiracy, the effect of these behaviours was to cover up the truth. 1.113 Even had none of the previous failings been known – and they were – baby Harry's death should surely have been a catalyst for immediate change. In fact, it required public remonstration by a coroner over two years later, precipitated by the persistence, diligence and courage of baby Harry's family, to reveal an organisation that did not accept its own failings, considered itself above scrutiny or accountability, and consistently rejected the opportunity to learn when things went wrong.

In response to the report, Chief Executive Tracey Fletcher apologised for the "harm and suffering" caused.

== See also ==
- Healthcare in Kent
- List of hospitals in England
- List of NHS trusts
