= Sarah Chapone =

English legal theorist

- Born: Sarah Kirkham; 11 December 1699; Stanton, Gloucestershire, England
- Died: 24 February 1764 (aged 64); Stanton, Gloucestershire, Great Britain
- Children: 5
- Relatives: Hester Chapone (daughter-in-law)
- Writing career
- Period: 18th century
- Notable work: The Hardships of the English Laws in Relation to Wives

Sarah Chapone (11 December 1699 – 24 February 1764), born Sarah Kirkham and often referred to as Mrs Chapone, (Note: 'Mrs Chapone' is also a common designation of Hester Chapone, Sarah's daughter-in-law through her son John.) was an English legal theorist, pamphleteer, and prolific letter writer. She is best known for the treatise The Hardships of the English Laws in Relation to Wives, published anonymously in 1735.

== Background ==
Chapone lived and wrote in mid-18th-century England. At home, the period, known as the Georgian era, was marked by the dominance of Robert Walpole in Parliament. Abroad, military conflict between France and England was constant, until the end of the Seven Years' War in 1763—one year before Chapone's death.

=== Feminism ===
Describing Chapone's theory as 'feminist' is an anachronism: the use of 'feminist' and 'feminism' to designate views favouring women's rights is attested only from the late 19th century. However, scholars have identified aspects of Chapone's work that correspond to present-day feminist theory. For instance, philosopher Jacqueline Broad argues that 'Chapone deserves a prominent place in the history of feminist philosophy as one of the first writers consistently to apply what is now known as the republican concept of liberty to the situation of married women in early modern society'.

=== Bluestocking circle ===
Scholars dispute whether Chapone was a bluestocking—an 18th-century term for an educated woman who belonged to tight-knit intellectual circles. One difference between Chapone and most bluestockings was her social status: unlike Elizabeth Montagu and Mary Delany, she did not come from wealth or nobility. Orr points out that Chapone, unlike most bluestockings, was particularly focussed on the law—bluestockings, while they were advocates for education and literary work by women, did not generally critique coverture.

== Personal life ==
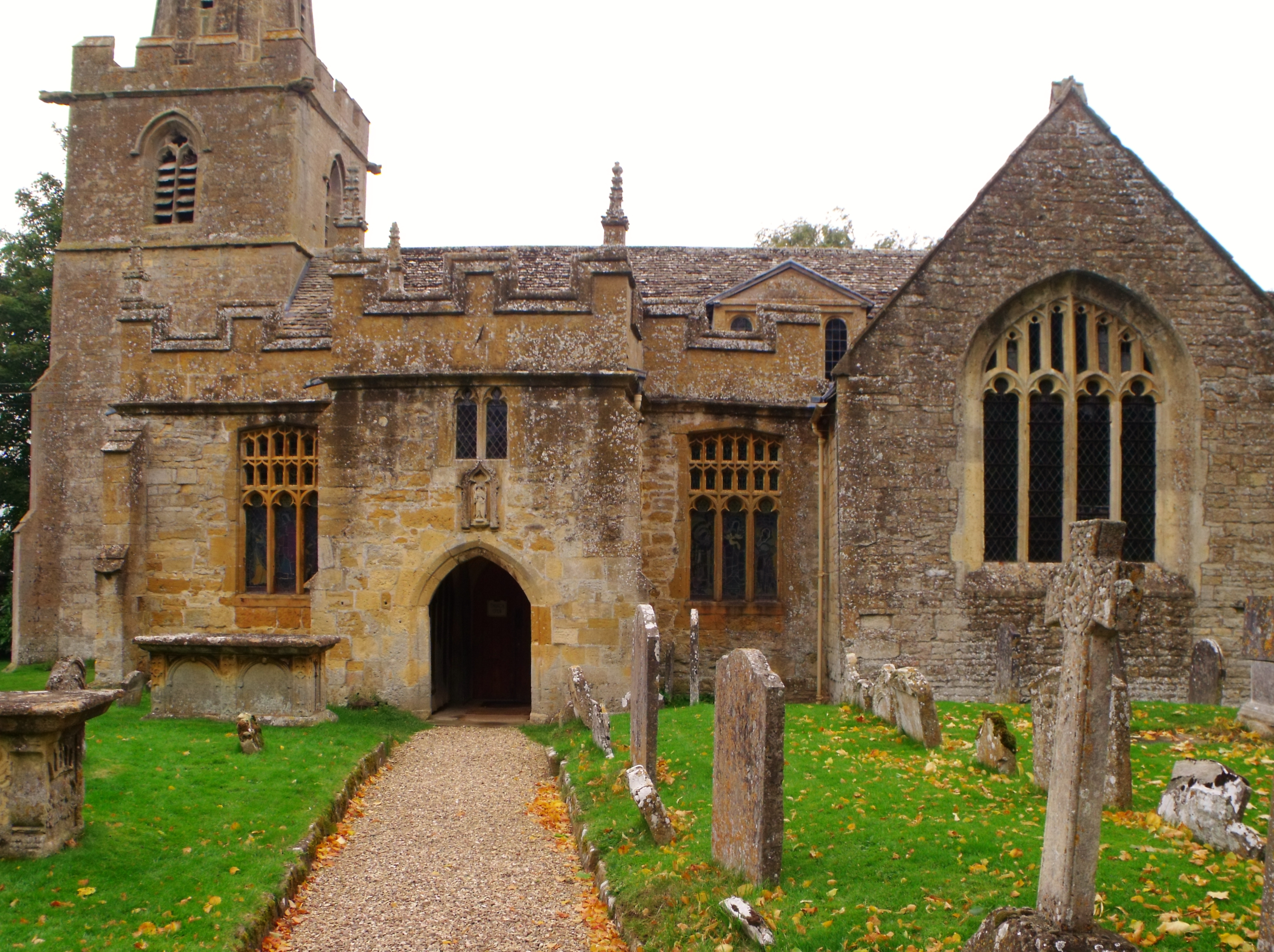
Church of St Michael and All Angels in Stanton. Chapone spent much of her life in Stanton and came from a family of Anglican clergy.

Chapone was born in 1699 to Damaris and the Reverend Lionel Kirkham, to a family largely of Anglican clergy. She was raised in her father's rectory in Stanton, Gloucestershire, then quite a remote area. She married Reverend John Chapone in 1725. John Wesley, the Anglican theologian, had courted her; they later became friends and correspondents. For nine years after her marriage, she operated a boarding school while raising five children. Money was short, and the family moved frequently, until John became vicar of Badgeworth in 1745.

Chapone was close with Mary Delany from 1715 (when Chapone was 16 and Delany 15) onwards. In her autobiography, Delany describes Chapone, whom she nicknamed Sappho: (Note: Delany also nicknamed Chapone 'Deborah' and 'Varanese'. Orr 2016, p. 98.)

She had an uncommon genius and intrepid spirit, which though really innocent, alarmed my father, and made him uneasy at my great attachment to her. … She entertained me with her wit, and she flattered me with her approbation, but by the improvements she has since made, I see she was not, at my first acquaintance, the perfect creature I thought her then... Her extraordinary understanding, lively imagination and human disposition, which soon became conspicuous, at last reconciled my father to her, and he never after debarred me the pleasure of seeing her ...

Eaves and Kimpel, in their monumental biography of Samuel Richardson, describe Chapone as 'moralistic', 'pious, earnest, verbose, and rather gushing'. Orr calls her 'vivacious'.

== Intellectual circle ==
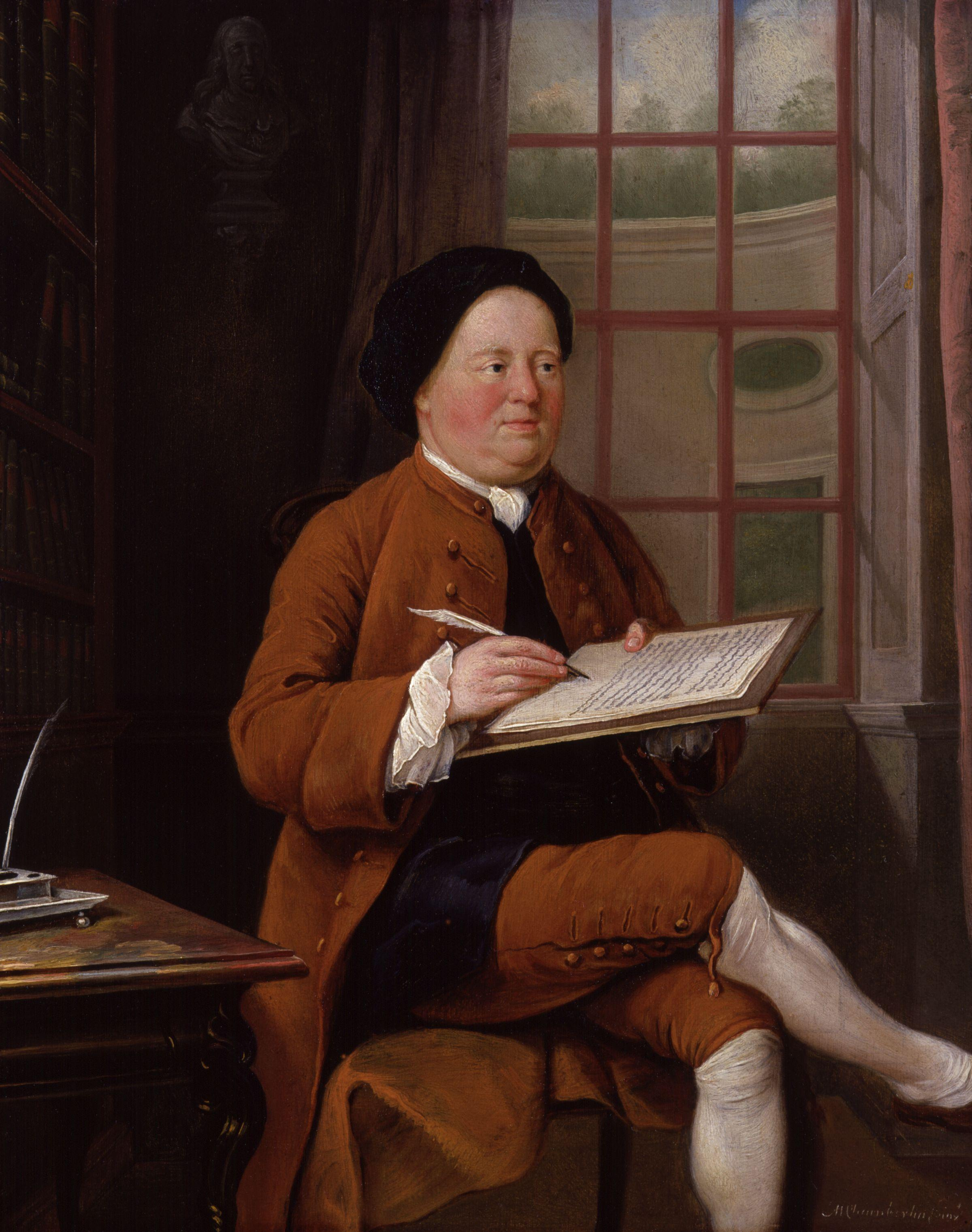
The novelist Samuel Richardson, a correspondent of Chapone

Chapone's friends and correspondents included George Ballard and Samuel Richardson. She reviewed Ballard's manuscripts of Memoirs of Several Ladies of Great Britain (1752), his biographical encyclopedia of women, and helped him find financial support for the project. Chapone also introduced Ballard to the works of Mary Astell, whom she had read for many years. Together, Chapone and Ballard worked to find Elizabeth Elstob, who by the 1730s was living in poverty, financial assistance and a better living situation.

Chapone struck up a correspondence with Richardson in 1750. Their relationship was 'almost purely epistolary'. Richardson had a high regard for Chapone, calling her 'a great Championess for her Sex'. In their numerous letters, they discuss Richardson's novel Clarissa and Chapone's views about the place of women in society.

Chapone objected to certain elements of Clarissa in her letters to Richardson. Eaves and Kimpel note that 'Mrs. Chapone … though generally admiring [of Clarissa], found the heroine short of her feminist ideal—she is too submissive to her father'. She argued that Clarissa ought to have sought legal remedies against her father Mr Harlowe, who forces her to marry Robert Solmes against her will. (Note: For a discussion of Mr Harlowe's role in Clarissa, see Stuber, Florian (1985). "On Fathers and Authority in Clarissa". SEL: Studies in English Literature 1500–1900. 25 (3): 557–574. doi:10.2307/450496. JSTOR 450496..)

As quoted in a letter of Richardson to Chapone, Chapone wrote:

A Parent is doubtless at Liberty to with-hold his Substance from a Child who at any Age, shall marry against his Consent … But he has no Authority to compel or command a Child at any Age to marry against his or her own.

== Works ==
=== Hardships ===
Edition of the Hardships in the collection of the Bodleian Library.

Although Chapone's Hardships (1735) was published anonymously, it was an 'open secret' at the time—and recent scholarship has confirmed—that she was the author. The treatise discusses coverture and argues that the legal situation of English women at the time was comparable to slavery.

=== Remarks ===
Chapone wrote her Remarks on Mrs. Muilman's (Note: Teresia Constantia Phillips was married to Henry Muilman; Chapone refers to her by her married name. See Brown, Susan; Clements, Patricia; Grundy, Isobel, eds. (2006). "Teresia Constantia Phillips". Orlando: Women's Writing in the British Isles from the Beginnings to the Present. Cambridge: Cambridge University Press Online.) Letter to the Right Honourable the Earl of Chesterfield (1750) in response to Teresia Constantia Phillips's A Letter Humbly Addressed to the Right Honourable the Earl of Chesterfield (1750).

Phillips's Letter was published following her earlier work An Apology for the Conduct of Mrs Teresia Constantia Phillips (1748). In the Apology, Phillips, known by that time as a courtesan, argues that she has now rejected such a life. The Letter was printed with the second edition of the Apology, published in 1750. Addressed to Philip Stanhope, 4th Earl of Chesterfield, it argues that Stanhope, as a man, was able to overcome the libertinism of his youth; but that Phillips, as a woman, could not escape her past in the view of the public.

Chapone's Remarks was published anonymously in 1750, but Chapone told Richardson privately that she had written it. Indeed, Richardson read a manuscript version of this work and may have printed it in 1750. It is not clear why Chapone decided to publish her Remarks on Phillips's Letter.

In her Remarks, Chapone expresses sympathy for Phillips's painful past—the Apology tells the story of Phillips's rape at age 13—but argues that Phillips has not sufficiently reformed her character or shown appropriate contrition. She further accuses Phillips of attempting to profit from Stanhope's reputation in addressing the Letter to him.

== Bibliography ==
- Bodek, Evelyn Gordon (1976). "Salonières and Bluestockings: Educated Obsolescence and Germinating Feminism". Feminist Studies. 3 (3/4): 185–199. doi:10.2307/3177736. hdl:2027/spo.0499697.0003.316. JSTOR 3177736.
- Broad, Jacqueline (January 2015). ""A Great Championess for Her Sex": Sarah Chapone on Liberty as Nondomination and Self-Mastery". The Monist. 98 (1): 77–88. doi:10.1093/monist/onu009. ISSN 0026-9662. JSTOR 44012715.
- Brophy, Elizabeth Bergen (1991). Women's Lives and the 18th-Century English Novel. Tampa: University of South Florida Press. ISBN 0-8130-1036-5. OCLC 22422353.
- Carroll, John, ed. (1964). Selected Letters of Samuel Richardson. Oxford: Clarendon Press – via Internet Archive.
- Chapone, Sarah (1735). The Hardships of the English Laws in Relation to Wives. London: William Bowyer and J. Roberts.
- Delany, Mary (1861). Lady Llanover (ed.). The Autobiography and Correspondence of Mary Granville, Mrs. Delany. Vol. 1. London: Richard Bentley. OCLC 1016238532.
- Eaves, T. C. Duncan; Kimpel, Ben (1971). Samuel Richardson: A Biography. Oxford: Clarendon Press. ISBN 978-0-19-812431-3. OCLC 31889992 – via Internet Archive.
- Glover, Susan (19 January 2018). "Introduction". In Glover, Susan Paterson (ed.). The Hardships of the English Laws in Relation to Wives. New York: Routledge. doi:10.4324/9781315557328. ISBN 978-1-315-55732-8.
- Hannan, Leonie (3 July 2014). "Collaborative Scholarship on the Margins: An Epistolary Network". Women's Writing. 21 (3): 290–315. doi:10.1080/09699082.2014.925031. ISSN 0969-9082. S2CID 161829922.
- Harris, Jocelyn (September 2012). "Philosophy and Sexual Politics in Mary Astell and Samuel Richardson". Intellectual History Review. 22 (3): 445–463. doi:10.1080/17496977.2012.695198. ISSN 1749-6977. S2CID 153638046.
- Orr, Clarissa Campbell (3 March 2016). "The Sappho of Gloucestershire: Sarah Chapone and Christian Feminism". In Heller, Deborah (ed.). Bluestockings Now!: The Evolution of a Social Role. London: Routledge. doi:10.4324/9781315569581. ISBN 978-1-315-56958-1.
- Perry, Ruth (1985). "Introduction". In Perry, Ruth (ed.). Memoirs of Several Ladies of Great Britain. Detroit: Wayne State University Press. ISBN 0-8143-1747-2. OCLC 10779597.
- Richetti, John J. (2017). A History of Eighteenth-Century British Literature. Hoboken, New Jersey: Wiley. doi:10.1002/9781119083436. ISBN 978-1-119-08213-2. OCLC 990778262.
