= William Harvey Hospital =

- East Kent Hospitals University NHS Foundation Trust
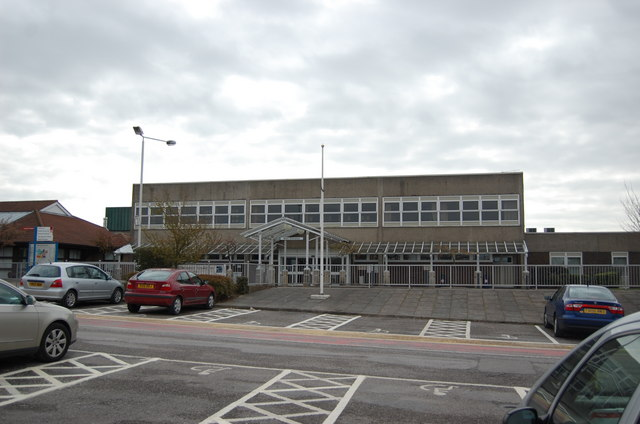
- Main entrance to the hospital

- Location within Kent

Geography
- Location: Ashford, Kent, England, United Kingdom
- Coordinates: 51.1413°N 0.9142°E

Organisation
- Care system: Public NHS

Services
- Emergency department: Yes Accident & Emergency
- Beds: 476

History
- Founded: 1977

Links
- Website: ekhuft.nhs.uk/patients-and-visitors/william-harvey-hospital/
- Lists: Hospitals in England

The William Harvey Hospital is a hospital in Willesborough, Ashford, Kent, England. It is one of the three main hospitals in the East Kent Hospitals University NHS Foundation Trust area and is named after William Harvey (1578–1657), the Folkestone-born doctor who discovered the blood circulatory system.

== History ==
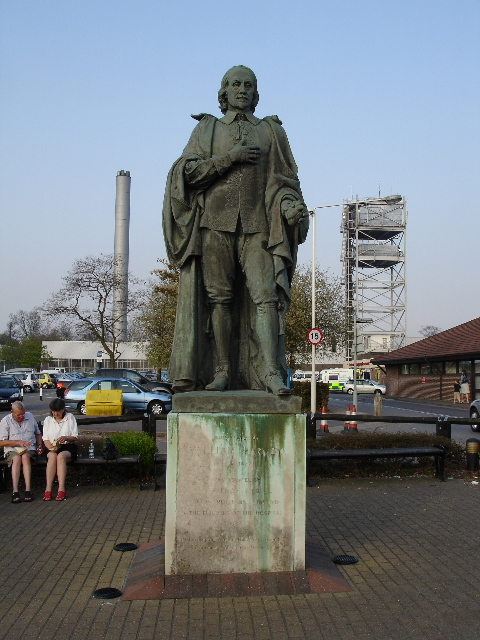
Statue of William Harvey by the hospital's entrance

The hospital replaced an older hospital to the west of town that had been running since 1928. It was planned as part of an overall plan to expand Ashford and the surrounding area by relocating people away from London in the late 1960s. The government decided the existing hospital infrastructure would not be able to cope, and set about locating a site away from Ashford town centre, with a proposed area of around 30 acres (12 ha) and a budget of £7–8 million. Work started on building the hospital in 1973, and it was commissioned in 1977 and opened in 1979. The old hospital remained open as a smaller unit, and by the 1980s it had become a hospital for the elderly.

The hospital currently employs about 2,500 people and has 476 beds as of March 2012. It includes a shop run by the Friends of the William Harvey Hospital, a volunteer-run society that provides basic goods and services to patients and visitors, and has raised £2.5 million in donations for the hospital. The Rotary Suite of the hospital is run by Spencer Private Hospitals, providing private treatments such as cosmetic surgery.

In April 2014 it was reported that the East Kent Hospitals University NHS Foundation Trust was looking for a partner to develop a private unit at the William Harvey site and enhance the returns from the Spencer private hospital on the Queen Elizabeth The Queen Mother Hospital site with a contract over the next 15 years.

== Criticism ==
In 1978, Keith Speed, MP for Ashford, criticised proposals that some services would require patients to be bussed back to the old hospital when William Harvey Hospital opened.

In 2000, the press reported that staff shortages at the hospital were putting patient's lives at risk, which drew local MP Damian Green to criticise the management of the NHS in parliament. Green continued to complain about the state of the hospital, noting in 2001 that patients had been waiting in the accident and emergency department for 24 hours.

In 2013, hospital staff members threatened to quit due to proposed increases in parking permit charges from March 2014. In some cases, the cost of a permit was planned to rise by over £500. One staff member reported that "Every day on the news there's somebody slagging off the NHS. Nobody ever says anything nice about us. No wonder morale is low here."

In 2021, East Kent Hospitals University NHS Foundation Trust was fined £733,000 for failures in the case of Harry Richford after an inquest found his death in 2017 was "wholly avoidable". He was transferred to the intensive neonatal unit at William Harvey Hospital in Ashford, but later died.

In 2022, East Kent Hospitals University NHS Foundation Trust apologised to a grieving mother who was told in 2021 that her baby was dead, then alive, before it died hours later.
