= Oxford Arms, Warwick Lane =

Former coaching inn in London, England

Coordinates: 51.5148°N 0.1013°W

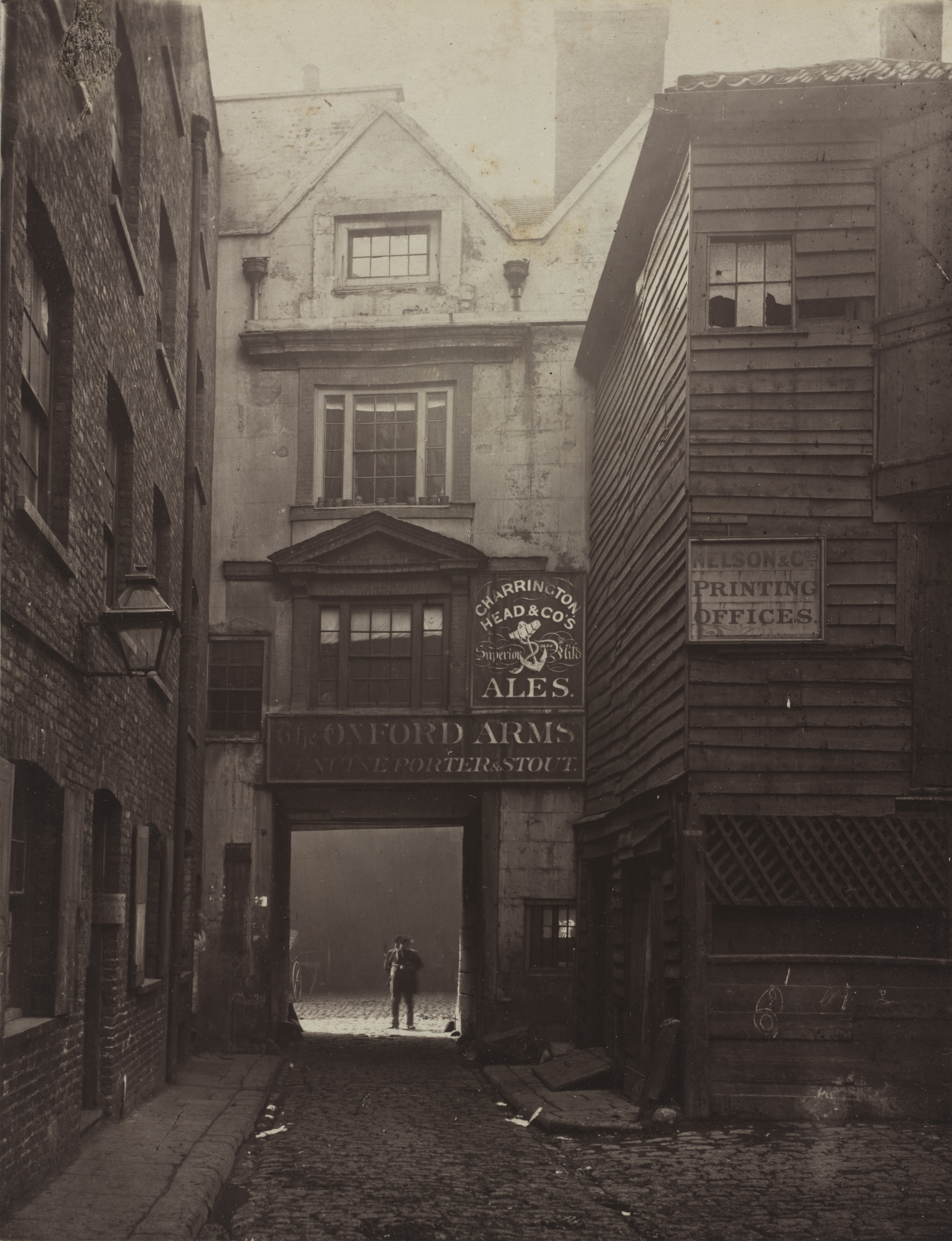
The Oxford Arms in 1875. Picture taken by Alfred & John Bool of the Society for Photographing Relics of Old London

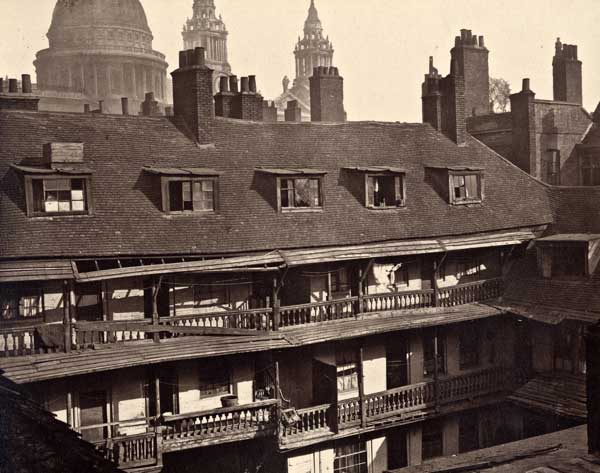
The other side of the courtyard in 1875

The Oxford Arms in Warwick Lane was one of the last surviving galleried coaching inns in London. It stood near St Paul's Cathedral between the 17th and late 19th centuries.

It was built in the seventeenth century, before being rebuilt and extended after the Great Fire. The replacement of horse-drawn coaches by the railways inevitably led to its decline, finally being pulled down in 1876 to be replaced by warehouses.

In 1869, the 'Book of Days' had an entry for the Oxford Arms.

The other galleried inn of Warwick-lane is the Oxford Arms, within a recess on the west side, and nearly adjoining to the residentiary houses of St Paul's in Amen-corner. It is one of the best specimens of the old London inns remaining in the metropolis. As you advance you observe a red brick pedimented facade of the time of Charles II, beneath which you enter the inn-yard, which has, on three of its sides, two stories of balustraded wooden galleries, with exterior staircases leading to the chambers on each floor: the fourth side being occupied by stabling, built against part of old London Wall.

Final dismantling of the Oxford Arms was not without some controversy, in representing the passing of an era as it did. While the outcry was not enough to save what had become an outmoded institution, its disappearance resulted in a change of public opinion that led indirectly to the foundation of the Society for the Protection of Ancient Buildings set up in 1877 by William Morris and other enthusiasts.

== See also ==
- The George Inn, Southwark, London's only surviving galleried coaching inn
