= London House, Aldersgate Street =

Former residence of the Bishop of London

Coordinates: 51.518331°N 0.09727°W

London House was the London mansion of the Bishop of London after the restoration of the monarchy in 1660. Today the site, 172 Aldersgate Street is occupied by a block of flats.

== History ==
Early in 1544 William Petre rented a small house on the west side of Aldersgate as a town house while engaged in his role as secretary to King Henry. Later that same year he purchased seven houses formerly the property of the neighboring St Bartholomew's Priory, adjoining the rented house. By 1549 Petre was renting a larger house from The Drapers Company which he had purchased by 1552. Petre continued to purchase others property and to extend his house over a number of years. By 1562 the house was large and contained a number of chambers and rooms according to an inventory.

Over the years Petre House was extended across the parish boundary into the former close of St Bartholomew's priory. This was later to cause disputes over the payment of parish fees. The house remained the townhouse until 1639 following the death of the 3rd Lord Petre.

During the Commonwealth the house was used as a prison and it was here in 1646 that Michael Hudson was imprisoned while being questioned by a Parliamentary committee about the flight of Charles I from Oxford to Newark-upon-Trent. Richard Lovelace, the poet, was, in 1648, confined in Lord Petre's house in Aldersgate by order of the House of Commons; and it continued to be used as a prison by Cromwell and his colleagues.

In 1657 it was the residence of Henry Pierrepont, Marquis of Dorchester.

After his death it was bought by the See of London, after the Great Fire had destroyed the bishop's residence in St. Paul's Churchyard and the house became known as London House. Bishop Henchman died there in 1675. In 1720 Bishop Robinson was residing in it. Shortly after the non-juror, Thomas Rawlinson ("Tom Folio"), removed his great library to London House, where he died in 1725.

After the restoration the house was given by Charles II to be the London City mansion of the Bishop of London. From that time it was known by the name of London House. After the bishops ceased to use it as a residence, it was at last let out into tenements and warehouses.

In the 1740's the house was the home of Jacob Ilive who in 1747 published a plan of the house as part of a boundary dispute, at the time the house covered almost 2 acres.

Bishop Sherlock, in 1749, obtained parliamentary power to dispose of London House for the benefit of the See.

In 1750–1751 the City of London Lying-in Hospital for married women and sick and lame Outpatients was located in London House before moving to Thanet or Shaftesbury House also in Aldersgate Street.

It was some years later purchased by Mr. Seddon, "an eminent upholsterer," and was destroyed by fire, July 14, 1768, but rebuilt, and the upholstery business was continued here till a few years back. London House was taken down and shops built on the site in 1871
