= Old Mansion House =

Former house in London

Coordinates: 51.513907°N 0.092717°W

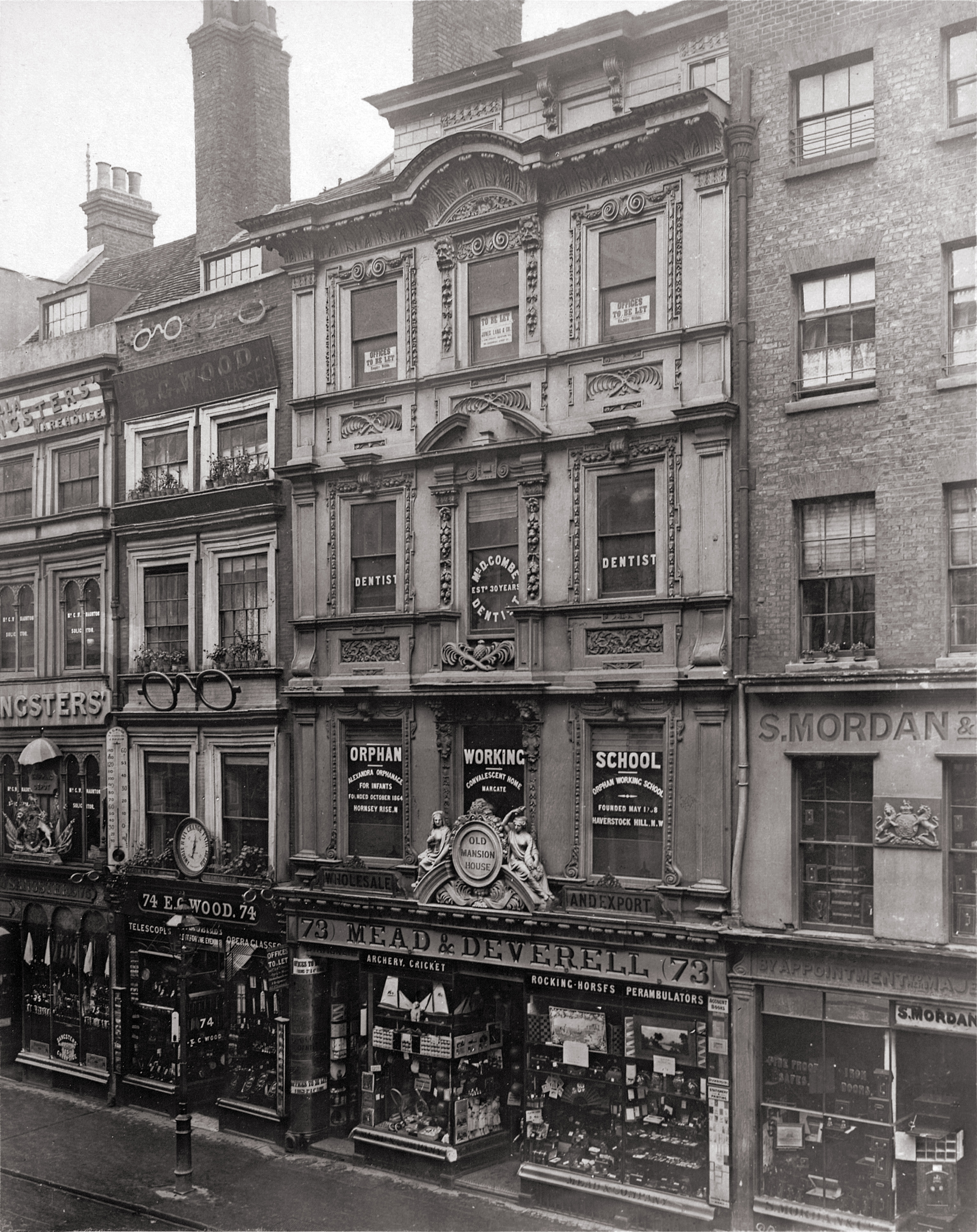
1883 photograph of Old Mansion House by Henry Dixon

Old Mansion House is the name given to a house that stood at 73 Cheapside in London.

== History ==
The house was built in 1669 following the Great Fire of London. It was designed by Christopher Wren for William Turner who was then serving as Lord Mayor of London, from which the house gets its name. It was also home of Thomas Tegg, a London bookseller.

The original house was demolished in the 1920s, although it retained an original staircase for a while longer. The facade however was retained and moved to Pines Garden in Kent.

== See also ==
- Cheapside
- List of demolished buildings and structures in London
