= Henry Dixon (photographer, born 1820) =

English architectural photographer

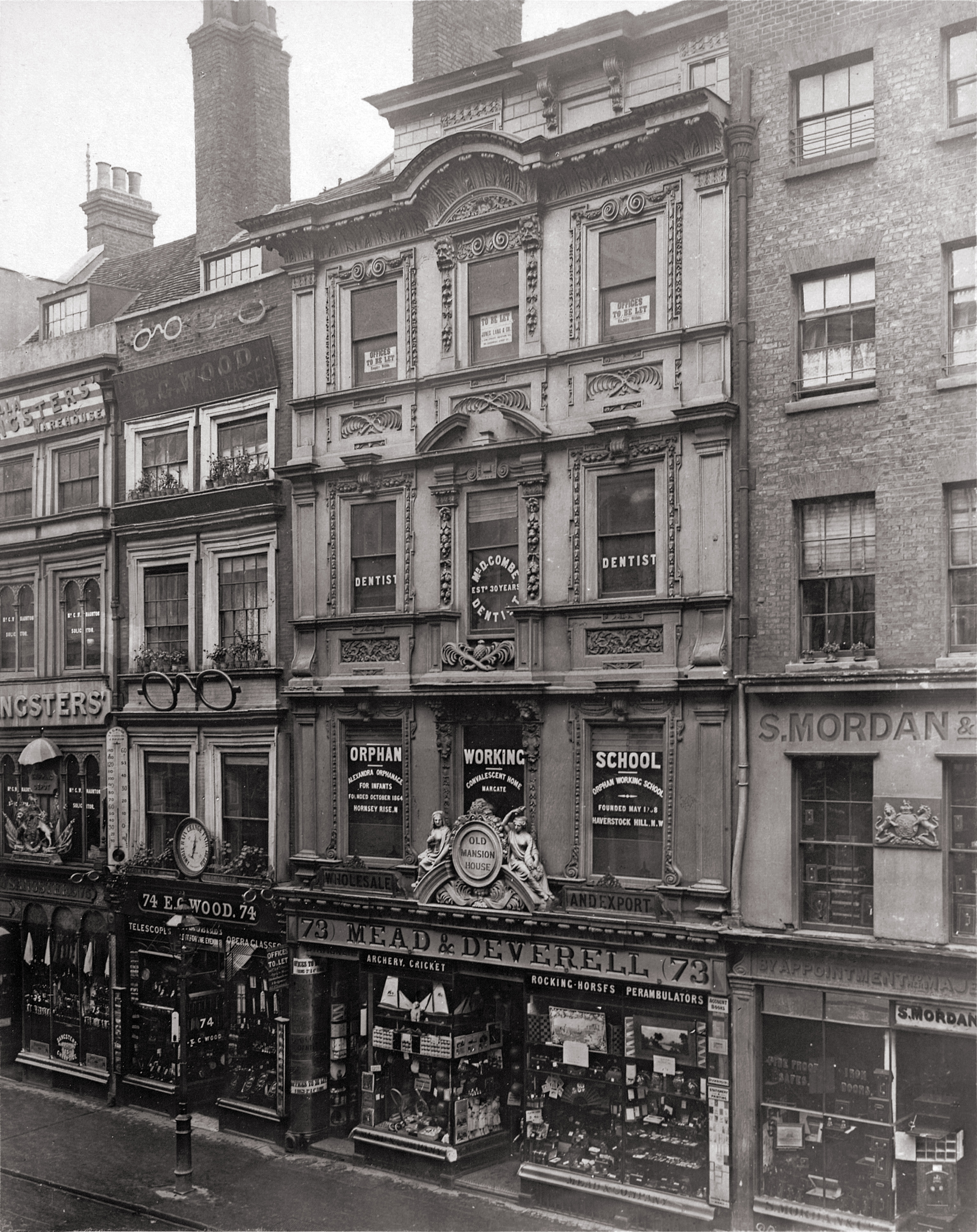
A photograph of 73 Cheapside or "Old Mansion House" by Dixon

Henry Dixon (1820–1893) was an English photographer best known for his work in the Society for Photographing Relics of Old London. Dixon would have nine children including Alice Dixon Le Plongeon.

== Career ==
Dixon like many of his contemporaries was first trained as a printer. He would work alongside Alfred & John Bool in photographing old buildings in London that were threatened by demolition for the Society for Photographing Relics of Old London.

Dixon would become a member of the Photographic Society in 1875.

He would later start a partnership with his son Thomas James Dixon in 1887, Dixon & Son, taking over as main photographers for the society as well as a secondary focus on fine art photography which would last past his death into the 1940s.

Dixon also lived nearby to London Zoo and would photograph many of the animals there during his life.

== See also ==
- Society for Photographing Relics of Old London
- Royal Photographic Society
