= City of London Maternity Hospital =

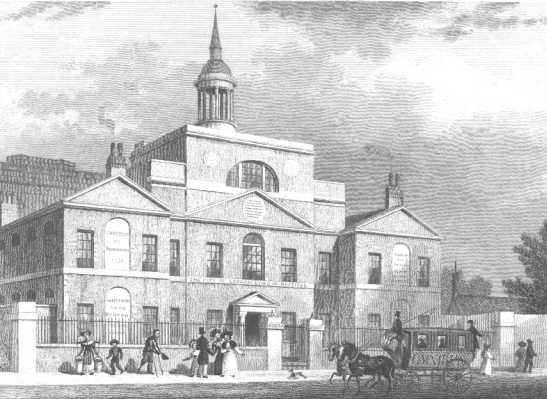
- The building designed by Robert Mylne

- Location within Islington

Geography
- Location: Holloway, London, England, United Kingdom
- Coordinates: 51.5684°N 0.1190°W

Organisation
- Type: Maternity

History
- Founded: 1750
- Closed: 1983

Links
- Lists: Hospitals in England

The City of London Maternity Hospital was a healthcare facility in London. Founded in 1750, it was closed and amalgamated with the Obstetric Unit at the Whittington Hospital in 1983.

== History ==
In 1750, the Governors appointed “for erecting a Lying-in Hospital for married women in the City of London and parts adjacent and also for Out-patients in Physic and Surgery” founded the City of London Lying-in Hospital for married women and sick and lame Outpatients at London House in Aldersgate Street. In 1751, the hospital moved to Thanet or Shaftesbury House also in Aldersgate Street and the second part of the title was dropped following a decision by the General Court of Governors to admit no more outpatients.

In 1773, the hospital moved to purpose-built premises designed by Robert Mylne between St Luke's Hospital for Lunatics and the Fox and Goose Ale House on City Road. Ann Newby was appointed matron.

Damaged by the construction of the Great Northern and City Railway underneath Old Street, the building was demolished and rebuilt on the same site between 1904 and 1907. The rules were relaxed in 1912, to allow "Singlewomen who are sufficiently recommended and are found to be deserving of the Benefits of the Hospital's Charity" to be eligible for admission for their first confinement and the name was changed to the City of London Maternity Hospital in 1918.

The hospital was granted a royal charter in 1935 and came under the control of the Northern Group Hospital Management Committee in 1948. Damaged by bombing in 1940 and 1941, it was decided not to rebuild on the noisy City Road site at the end of the war and former homes for the blind in Hanley Road were acquired from the Royal National Institute of Blind People in 1949. Clinics continued to be held at City Road until 1955, when a modern building was opened at Hanley Road. In 1983, the hospital was closed and amalgamated with the Obstetric Unit at the Whittington Hospital to form the City of London Maternity Unit.

== Notable staff ==
- Greaves; Edith Elizabeth, MBE, OBE, Matron, 1912 until at least 1944. Greaves was a member of the council of the Central Midwives Board.
