= Bermondsey Spa Gardens =

Park in Bermondsey, London

Coordinates: 51.4949°N 0.0745°W

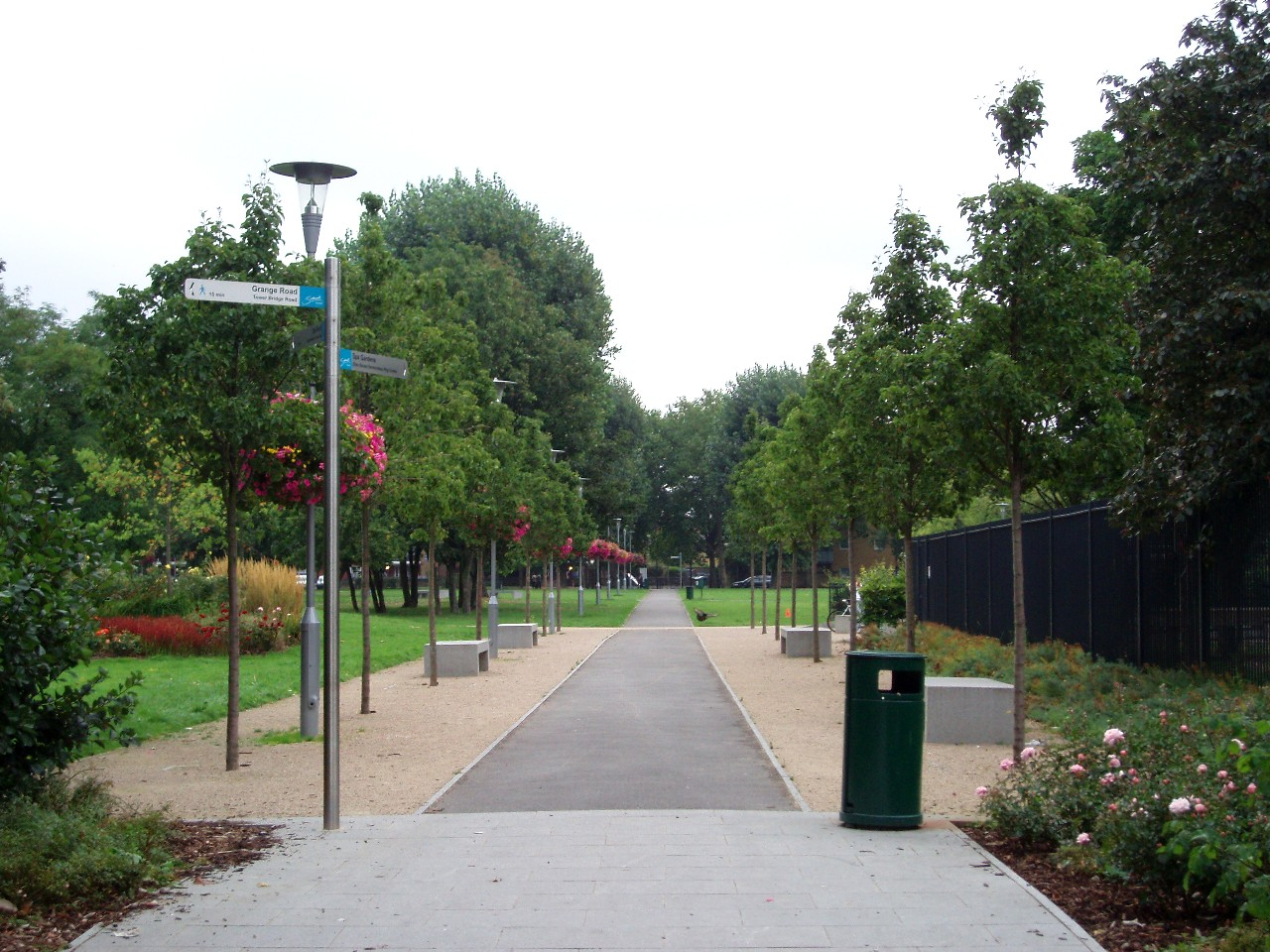
The gardens in 2008

Bermondsey Spa Gardens is a park in Bermondsey, London. It is located on Grange Road, SE1 3AH. The park has been included in the recent and ongoing regeneration of the Bermondsey Spa area. The 4.5-acre (18,000 m^{2}) park, with improvements designed by the architects Broadway Malyan, is intended to act as a focal point for the surrounding area.

== Origins ==
The park is on the site of the 18th century Bermondsey Spa, opened by Thomas Keyse in the 1760s: an adjacent street is Keyse Road. After Keyse's gardens closed, they were built over. The area was bombed heavily in WW2. The park was opened, by the Mayor of Bermondsey, in 1954.

== Facilities ==
The park was closed for redevelopment in 2005 and then re-opened in March 2006. The £2 million redevelopment furnished the park with new lighting, signage, bins, paths, plants and play equipment. In addition, the Ellen Brown Bermondsey Play Centre was built. This building is shared by a Sure Start centre, Southwark Play Services and a small café. There is a running path and exercise equipment.

== Surrounds ==
The park is bordered by Spa Road to the north, Grange Road to the west, and Alscot Road to the east and south, with Keyse Road running to the south-west. On the Spa Road side is the former Bermondsey public library, a Grade II listed Victorian red-brick building from 1890, which has recently been restored. It is now home to the Kagyu Samye Dzong Tibetan Buddhist Centre. On the corner of Spa Road and Alscot Road is the former Bermondsey Town Hall. On the Grange Road side is the Art Deco former Alaska fur factory, built by Wallis, Gilbert and Partners in 1932. The Boucher Church of England Primary School's playground is on the site of St Luke's Bermondsey, which was bombed in WW2 and demolished in the 1960s.
