= Kagyu Samye Dzong London =

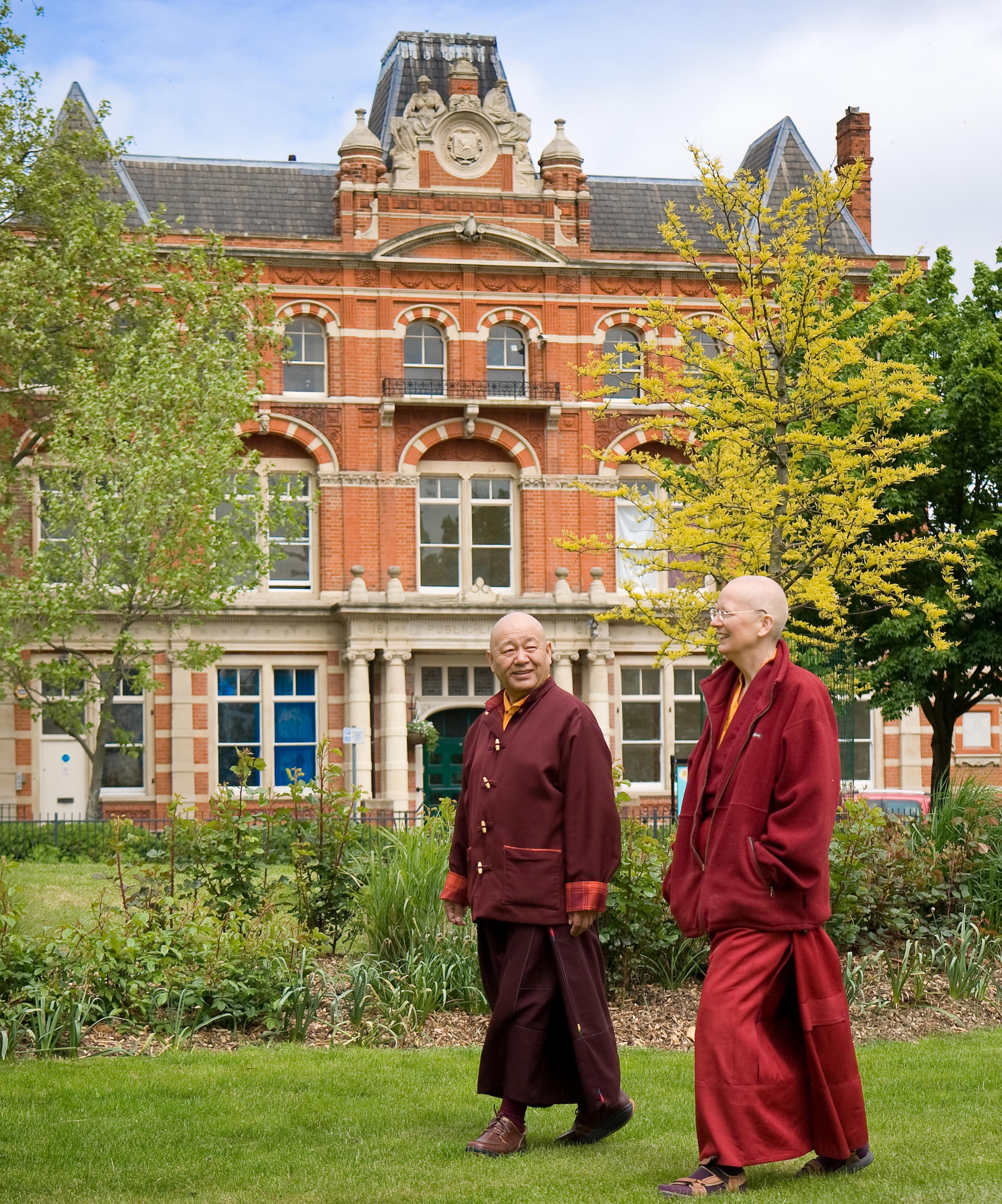
- Lama Yeshe Losal Rinpoche and Lama Zangmo in Spa Gardens, outside Kagyu Samye Dzong London

Religion
- Affiliation: Karma Kagyu Lineage

Location
- Location: 15 Spa Road, London SE16 3SA
- Interactive map of Kagyu Samye Dzong London
- Coordinates: 51.4956°N 0.0745°W

Architecture
- Completed: 1998; 28 years ago

Website
- www.london.samye.org

Kagyu Samye Dzong London Tibetan Buddhist Centre for World Peace and Health is the London branch of Kagyu Samye Ling Monastery in Scotland. Kagyu Samye Dzong London is under the direct guidance of Chöje Akong Tulku Rinpoche and Venerable Lama Yeshe Losal Rinpoche, the co-founder and Abbot of Samye Ling respectively.

== History ==
Kagyu Samye Dzong London initially opened in 1998 in the former Holy Trinity School near Waterloo station in the London Borough of Lambeth. The centre remained here until 2007 when the site became subject to redevelopment as part of the Terry Farrell-designed Founder's Place scheme. This development was subsequently cancelled in 2010.

The current Samye Dzong London centre is located in the former Bermondsey public library in Southwark, South East London, close to the River Thames, Tower Bridge and London Bridge.

Designed by John Johnson, the building dates from 1892 and was one of the first free public libraries in London. Dr Alfred Salter MP and his wife Ada (the first woman mayor in London) used the library as a base from which many public health initiatives were launched. It remained in operation as a public library until the 1980s after which it was used as office space by London Borough of Southwark. The Grade II listed building is adjacent to the Bermondsey Town Hall and opposite Spa Gardens. It is within the Bermondsey Spa Regeneration area.

The building was bought by Kagyu Samye Dzong London from Southwark Council in 2009. It was renovated by a volunteer workforce and opened to the public in June 2010.

== The Centre ==
The day-to-day running of the centre is overseen by resident director and teacher Lama Gelongma Zangmo. Danish by birth, Lama Zangmo has been practising Buddhism since arriving at Samye Ling in 1977.

The main shrine room can seat around 200 people and is used for large events and teachings. The shrine houses a Buddha statue which is approximately 3 metres in height.

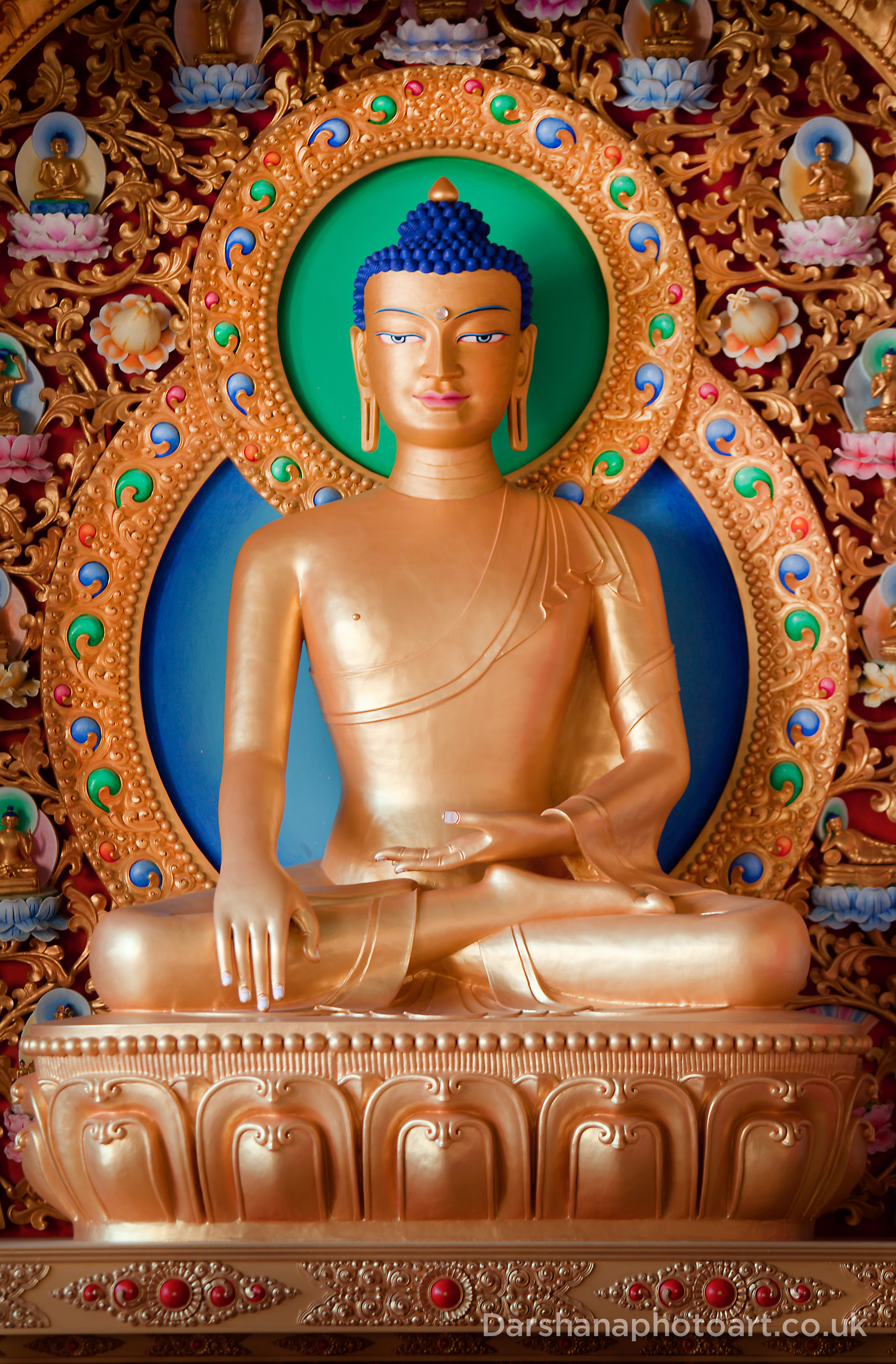
Kagyu Samye Dzong London main Buddha statue

In April 2013 a second shrine room was opened by Akong Tulku Rinpoche. This followed a five-month project of traditional Tibetan artwork by volunteer artists under the guidance of renowned thangka painter Lama Rigzin who travelled from Nepal to oversee the work. This shrine room is located in the main hall of the original Victorian library.

== Activities ==
The main function of the centre is to provide a place for meditation and teaching on Tibetan Buddhism within the Kagyu Tradition. Other activities include Yoga, Tai Chi, martial arts, Parkour dancing, mindfulness training and meditation. A Tibetan Doctor visits the centre monthly for consultations.

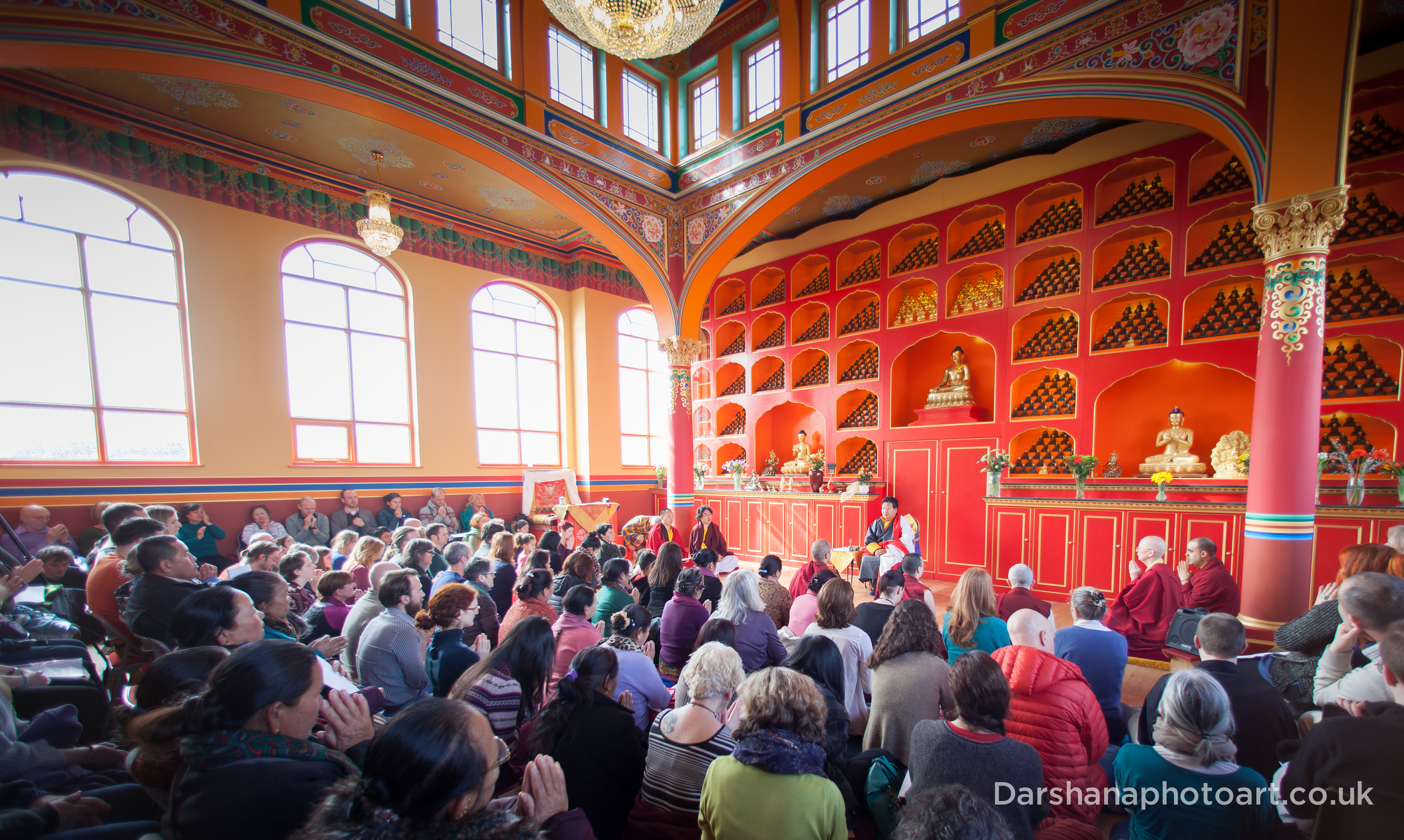
Akong Rinpoche opens the new shrine room at Kagyu Samye Dzong London

== Teachers ==
=== Visiting lineage teachers ===
In addition to teachings and empowerments from Akong Tulku Rinpoche and Lama Yeshe Losal Rinpoche, Kagyu Samye Dzong London has, since its foundation, hosted a number of visiting lineage teachers including Khenchen Thrangu Rinpoche, Khenpo Tsultrim Gyamtso Rinpoche, Ponlop Rinpoche, Mingyur Rinpoche, Ringu Tulku Rinpoche, Khenpo Damcho Dawa Rinpoche and Drupon Rinpoche Khenpo Lhabu.

=== Dharma and meditation teachers ===
Rob Nairn, Alistair Appleton and Clive Holmes regularly teach at the centre on various dharma topics, meditation and mindfulness. The Mindfulness Association also runs certificated training courses at the centre.

=== Regular teachings ===
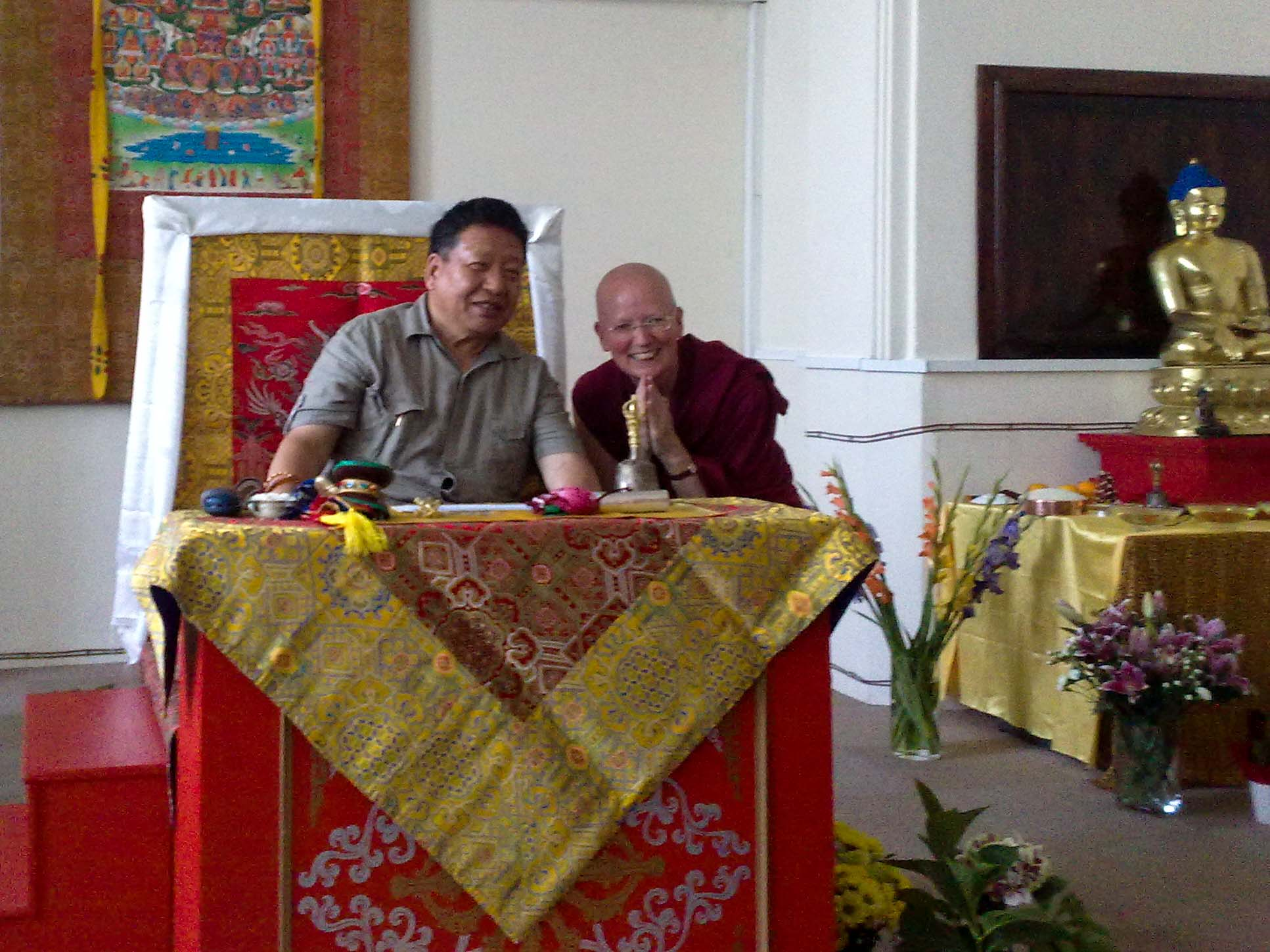
Akong Rinpoche and Lama Zangmo in London Samye Dzong, July 2009

For most of the year Lama Zangmo teaches a weekly class based on a core Buddhist text. She also regularly gives instruction on central Kagyu practices.

== London Bardo Group ==
The London Bardo Group, which is run by volunteers connected with Kagyu Samye Dzong London, can provide assistance to people with critical or terminal illness. It offers both practical and spiritual help.

== Manor Place Centre ==
A second, smaller centre was located about one mile (1.6 km) away at the Manor Place Baths in Manor Place, Kennington. This Victorian building, of a very similar age to the Bermondsey centre, was the original public baths and wash-house for the local population. It was leased and renovated by Kagyu Samye Dzong London as a temporary home before the Bermondsey centre was bought and renovated. The Manor Place centre was used as a meditation centre with regular teachings, introductory meditation classes and short meditation retreats until 2015.
