= Rouel Road =

Street in Bermondsey, London

Coordinates: 51.4959°N 0.0700°W

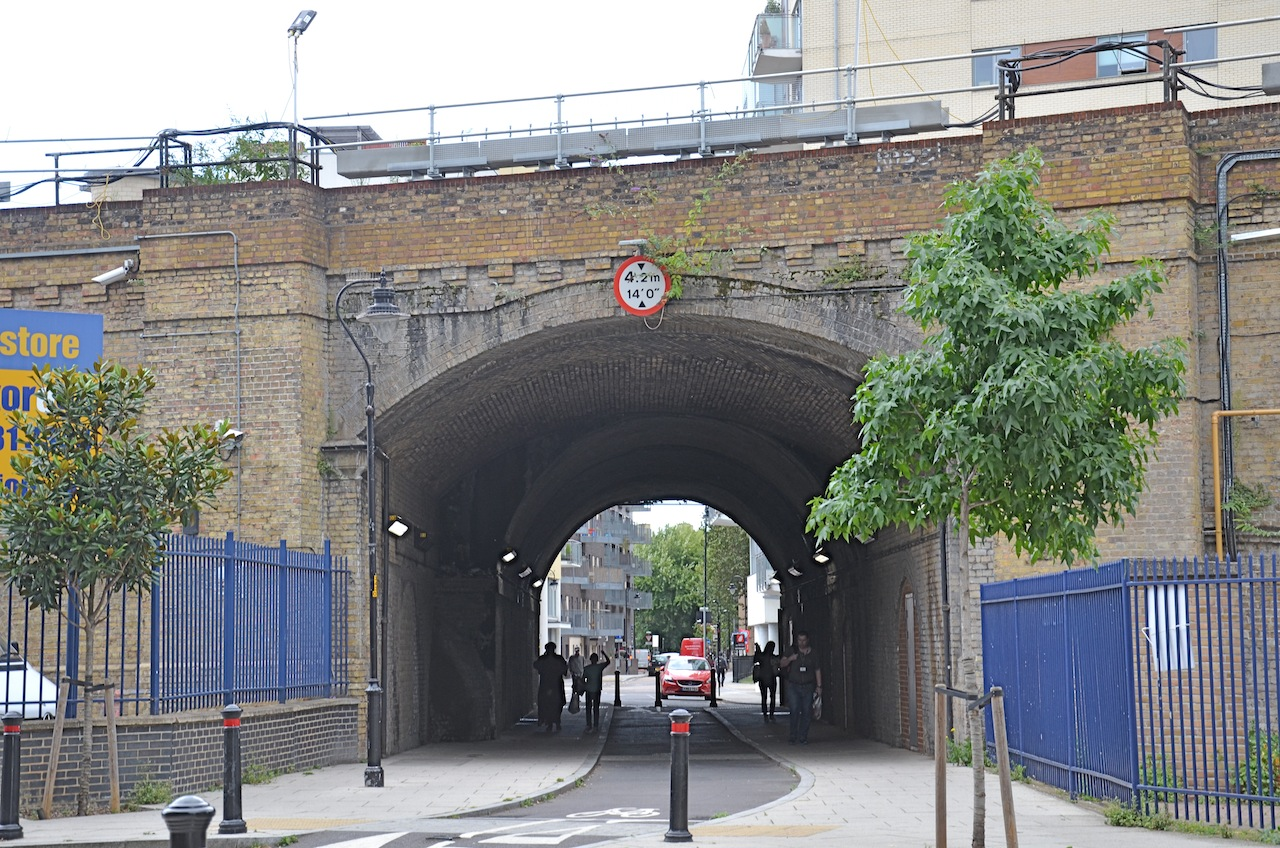
Railway viaduct at the northern end of Rouel Road.

Rouel Road is a street in the Bermondsey area of south London. It crosses the larger Spa Road.

== History ==
The name Rouel was approved in 1864, probably taken from Rouel Cottages. Most of the land around Rouel Road itself was owned by John Rolls, 1st Baron Llangattock, who also owned land and other properties in Wales including The Hendre. These were inherited through Sarah Coysh, who had married John Rolls of The Grange, Bermondsey in the latter part of the 18th century. Much of the land and properties adjacent to Rouel Road were managed by John Rolls' agents, one of whom was a J. R .Dickens of 155 Old Kent Road, which until the late 1960s remained as a rent payment office for the use of tenants. Lord & Lady Rolls were the last aristocratic landlords of Rouel Road.

Before any major construction took place, the area itself was mainly small farms, market gardens and cottages. In the 18th and 19th centuries the immediate surrounding area did boast the Bermondsey Spa and the first railway station in London, Spa Road railway station, original terminus of the London & Greenwich Railway (opened 1836). Rouel Road also had its own pub, the built-in 1869.

It appears that as industrialization began to take place leather tanning was to the fore, Bermondsey being known for its work with leather and hides. There is some proof of this industry in Rouel Road: research at L.M.A revealed two large tanneries one of them almost certainly sited to the east side of Rouel Road, later a preservative's factory Liptons would be built on this site.

In 1894 there were plans to build, three separate blocks of artisan dwellings to be inhabited by persons of the working class. The plans were turned down due to lack of space, between the buildings.

There were many food and provision manufacturers within the confines of Rouel Road. One of the early entrants was Pearce & Duffs This image was obtained from Southwark historical archives Borough high street SE1. Custard gelatin manufacturers, who were located at 93–95, records kept at date the company entry as producing produce as early as 1847 indeed Booths records: walk 28 indicate that small scale manufacturing of food additives was taking place. It appears from the post office directory that the owners were Elizabeth Jane Duff (granddaughter of William Pearce), Daniel Duff and David Duff Junior; who were registered as occupiers in the 1912/13 census. The family, it was believed, had its origins and owned property in Beckenham Kent. The other large manufacturer was Liptons producing jam and preservatives from 1894. The factory itself was closed after a fire in the 1960s. Other small and medium-sized manufacturers were sited in adjacent side roads. To the east was Lucy Road which contained a metallic cask works and tin manufacturers, and off Dockley Road was a deep stamping works. Behind and to the south of Pearce & Duffs was a glue size works known in the 1950s and 1960s as. Aerial photographs of 1926–28 provide a very good idea of Rouel Road in its manufacturing heyday; these photographs are kept at The Southwark Archive Library, Borough High Street, London SE1. At one time the north end of Rouel Road a tramway ran from Grange Road to Jamaica Road. The road also had a large Congregational church , built in the 1860s, which was later used as a Synagogue ; this existed there until the early 1970s.

The houses in Rouel Road – particularly those constructed to the northeast, before and after Lucy Road and Cadbury Road – were of a large and accommodating nature. Their design incorporated a large basement; the colloquial term was an "airey". These were constructed perhaps with a requirement for a small number of servants, with accommodation for cook and scullery maid; there were seven rooms in all. Later residents may have thought this to be too much of a grand idea for Rouel Road, but we must keep in mind the date the houses were built – approximately 1867 when the area would have been desirable for an ever-increasing number of clerks, merchants, and bankers working in the newly burgeoning City of London business districts. Later the road would sadly suffer from the incorporation of too many industries, the extra noise and pollution would have upset the genteel qualities of the road, leading to a middle-class population flight to the outer suburbs of Kent including Beckenham, Catford, and Bromley.

Other districts close by did retain a somewhat more residential nature. The West Estate located to the south of Blue Anchor Road, later to be called Southwark Park Road, incorporated various roads and small squares; Reverdy Road and Thorburn Square are good examples. These contained very little industry, which helped it retain more of a residential and domestic nature, but the houses located in these roads were of a smaller size and structure.
