= Manor Place Baths =

Public baths in Southwark, London, England

Coordinates: 51°29′18″N 0°05′53″W

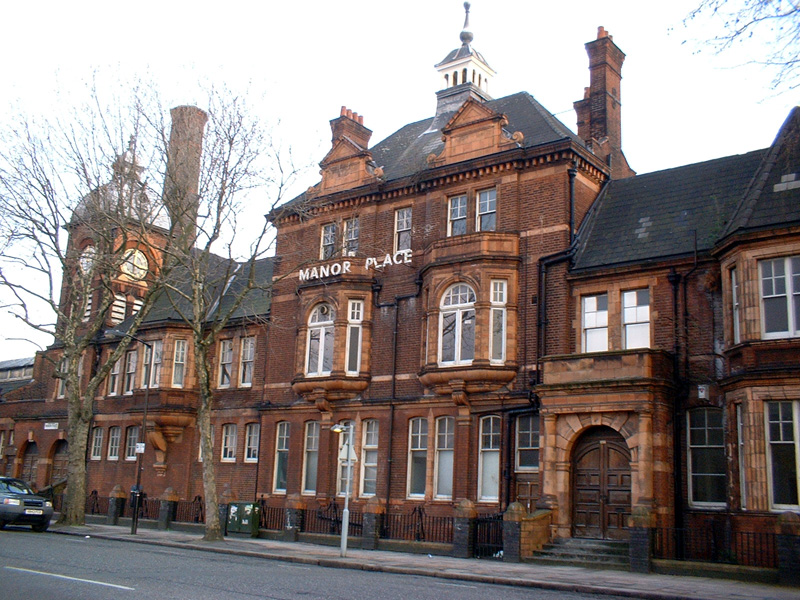
Manor Place Baths

Manor Place Baths is a former public baths, swimming pool and boxing venue in Manor Place off Walworth Road in Newington, London. The late-19th century Victorian structure, designed by the company of Edward I'Anson, is a grade II listed building.

It is a largely symmetrical building, asymmetrically composed from a variety of Arts and Crafts and Flemish Renaissance elements. It was built in red brick in Flemish bond with terracotta dressings, and features a clock tower and a large bathing hall. A plaque in the main stair hall dates the building to 1895.

The building was used by the local population for swimming, bathing and doing laundry. The baths had a first- and second-class pool for men, as well as a pool for women known as the "small swim". Mixed-gender swimming was introduced in 1904. The baths also had 74 individual bathing cubicles (most originally only for men), showers and a laundry room.

The first-class pool was 120 ft long and boarded over in winter so that the space could be used for sporting events, concerts and other public meetings. In particular, the baths were a popular venue for both amateur and professional boxing. Boxing at the baths started in 1908 and boxers who fought bouts there included the Kray twins as well as Ken Buchanan, Johnny Clark, Henry Cooper, Cornelius Boza-Edwards, Albert Finch, Dick Richardson and Terry Spinks. In total some 230 boxing shows and 1500 bouts were held at the baths.

== History ==
The baths were built by the vestry of Newington to improve public hygiene and health. Construction on the baths began in 1895, and the baths officially opened on 16 March 1898, leading the mayor of New York City to state: "There is no public bathing establishment even approximating this in the United States."

The building survived heavy bombing of the area in World War II. It began to fall into disuse as public baths in the decades after the war as most apartments in the area began to have bathrooms installed. It was used by locals to do laundry up until the 1970s. The baths closed as a public facility in 1976 but continued as a boxing venue until a final show in 1978. By 1995 it was in a dangerously poor condition with no viable use. In 1996 it was Grade II-listed and placed on the Buildings at Risk Register by English Heritage.

The building was used by Southwark London Borough Council as offices until 2005, when Tibetan Buddhist organisation Kagyu Samye Dzong London obtained a five-year lease to use the building as a temporary home while their new Bermondsey location was being renovated. They renovated the building and opened it under the name Manor Place Samye Dzong on 17 March 2007. The building was used as a meditation centre with regular classes and retreats until 2015.

In late 2013, the baths (as well as the adjacent recycling depot) were purchased by Notting Hill Housing to be converted into residential accommodation and commercial space.

On 21 April 2018, the Essex Ex-Boxers’ Association staged a boxing reunion at Manor Place Baths to raise funds for the family of boxer Scott Westgarth, who died in February of that year after sustaining injuries in a fight.
