= The Bermondsey Lion =

Sculpture by Kevin Boys

Coordinates: 51°29′32.48″N 0°03′48.96″W

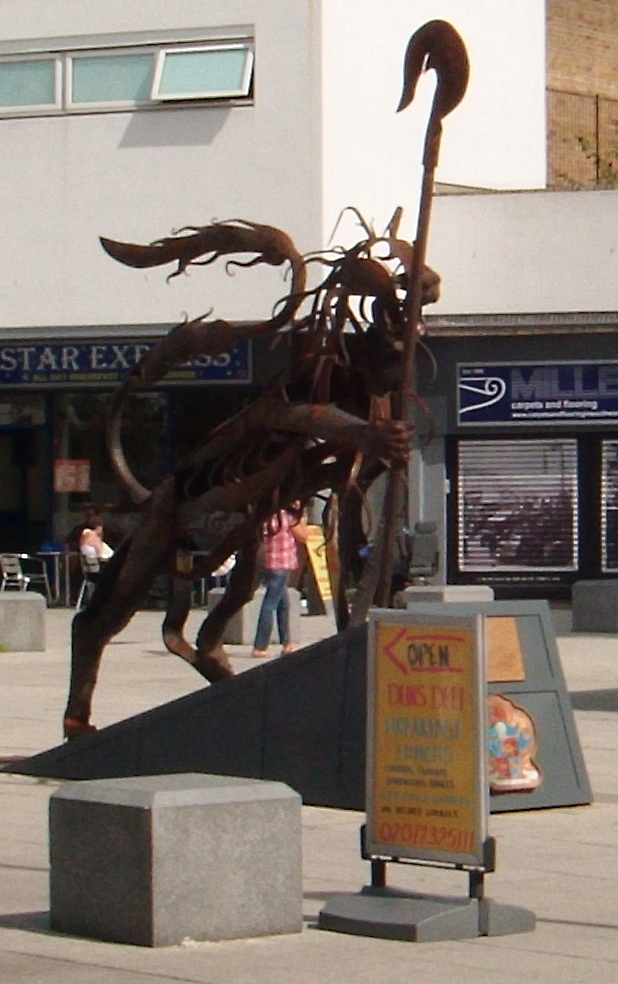
The Bermondsey Lion

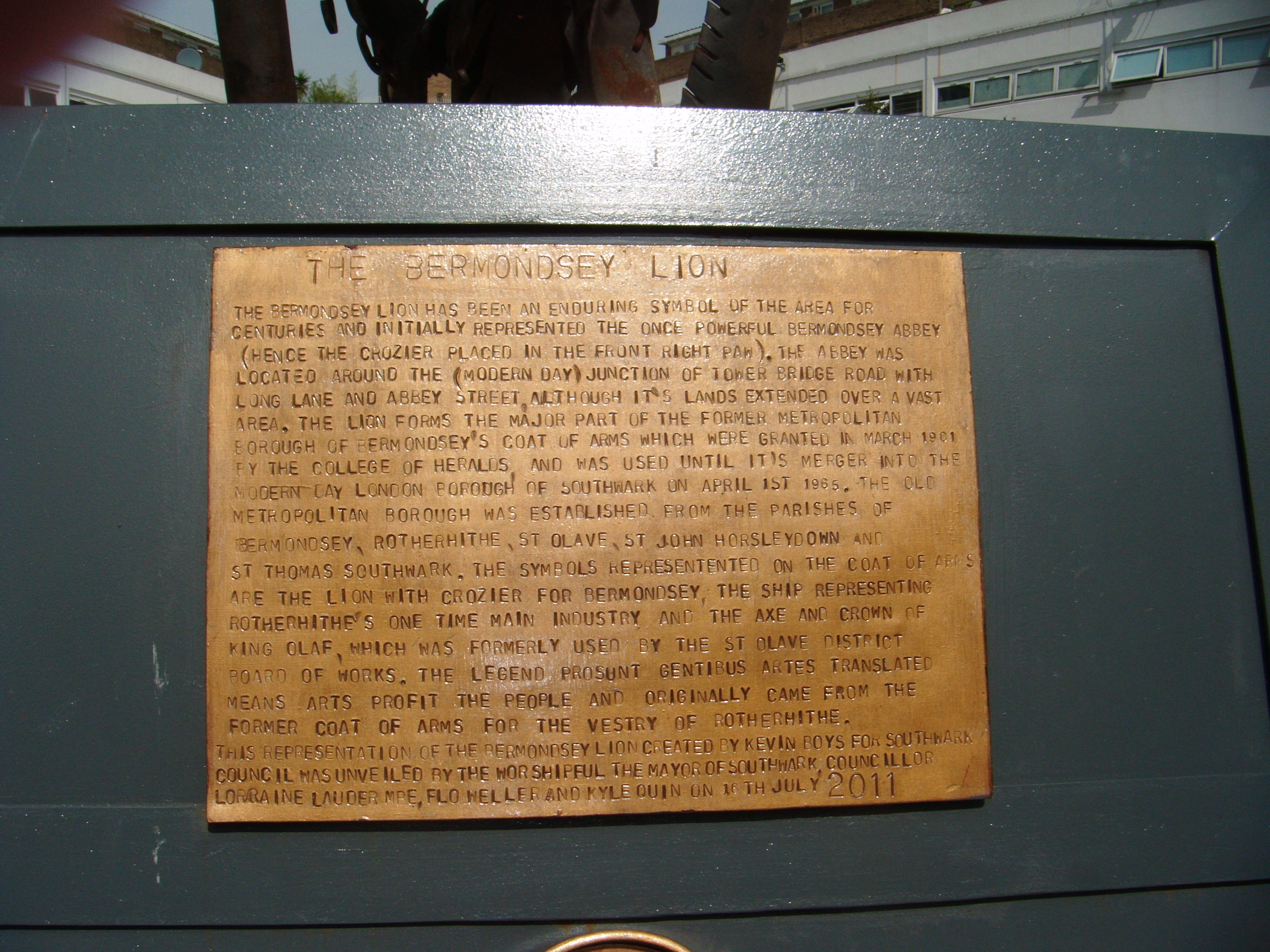
Plaque on the plinth of The Bermondsey Lion

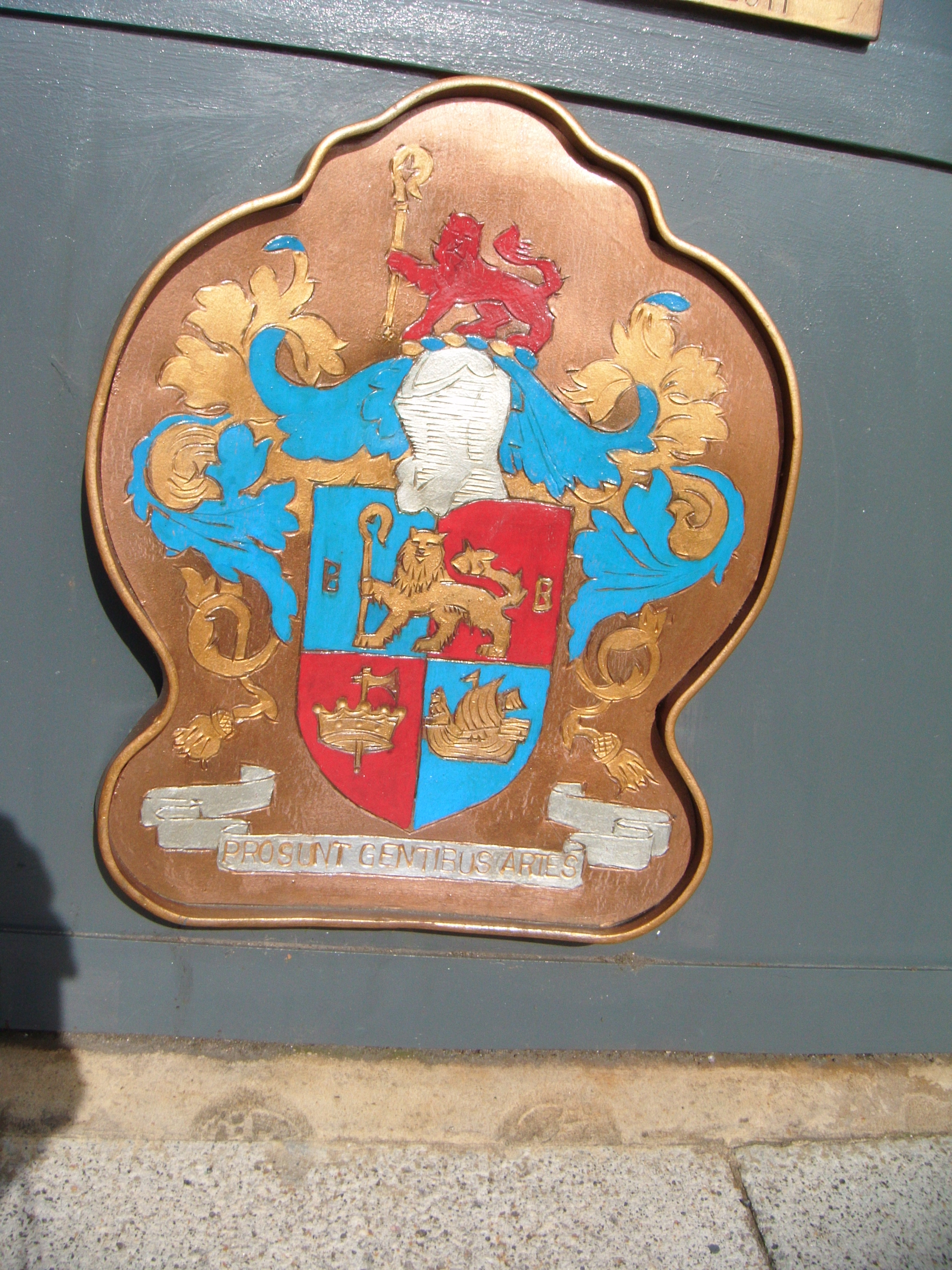
Arms of the former Metropolitan Borough of Bermondsey below the plaque on the plinth

The Bermondsey Lion is a sculpture in The Blue, Bermondsey, London, created by Kevin Boys for Southwark Council. It was unveiled on 16 July 2011.

The plaque on the plinth of the statue states:

The Bermondsey Lion has been an enduring symbol of the area for centuries and initially represented the once powerful Bermondsey Abbey (hence the crozier placed in the front right paw). The Abbey was located around the (modern day) junction of Tower Bridge Road with Long Lane and Abbey Street, although it's [sic] lands extended over a vast area. The lion forms the major part of the former Metropolitan Borough of Bermondsey's coat of arms which were granted in March 1901 by the College of Heralds and was used until it's [sic] merger into the modern day London Borough of Southwark on April 1st 1965. the old metropolitan borough was established from the parishes of Bermondsey, Rotherhithe, St Olave, St John Horsleydown and St Thomas Southwark. The symbols represented on the coat of arms are the lion with crozier for Bermondsey, the ship representing Rotherhithe's one time main industry and the axe and crown of King Olaf which was formerly used by the St Olave District Board of works. The legend Prosunt Gentibus Artes translated means Arts Profit the People and originally came from the former coat of arms for the vestry of Rotherhithe.

This representation of the Bermondsey Lion created by Kevin Boys for Southwark Council was unveiled by the Worshipful the Mayor of Southwark, councillor Lorraine Lauder MBE, Flo Weller and Kyle Quin on 16th July 2011.
