= Metropolitan Borough of Bermondsey =

Coordinates: 51.4958°N 0.0738°W

Bermondsey
- Metropolitan borough
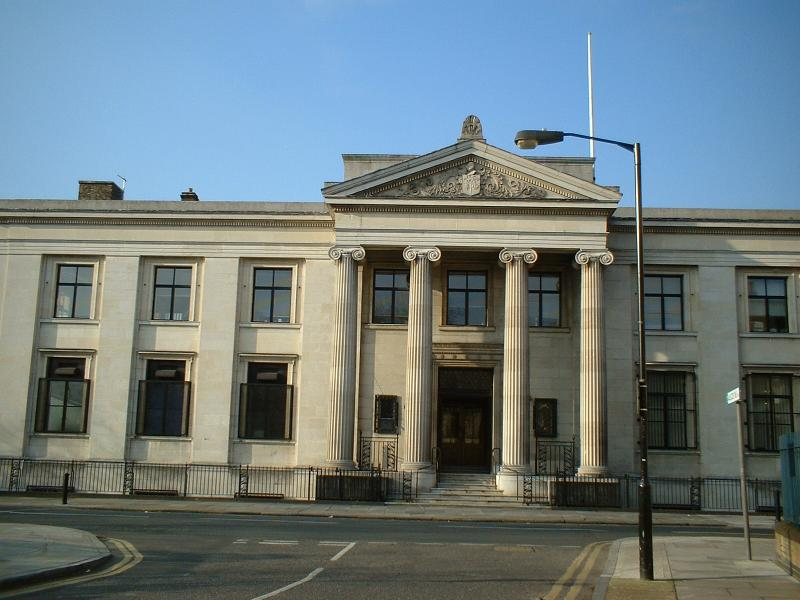
- Bermondsey Town Hall

- Bermondsey within the County of London
- Interactive map of the borough
- Area
  - 1911: 1,500 acres (6.1 km^{2})
  - 1931: 1,503 acres (6.08 km^{2})
  - 1961: 1,504 acres (6.09 km^{2})
- Population
  - 1911: 125,903
  - 1931: 111,542
  - 1961: 51,860
- Density
  - 1911: 84/acre
  - 1931: 74/acre
  - 1961: 34/acre
- History
  - Origin: Bermondsey parish; Rotherhithe parish; St Olave District
  - Created: 1900
  - Abolished: 1965
  - Succeeded by: London Borough of Southwark
- Status: Metropolitan borough
- Government: Bermondsey Borough Council
  - HQ: Spa Road
  - Motto: Prosunt gentibus artes (Arts profit the people)
- Coat of arms of the borough council

The Metropolitan Borough of Bermondsey was a metropolitan borough in the County of London, created in 1900 by the London Government Act 1899. It was abolished and its area became part of the London Borough of Southwark in 1965.

== History ==
The borough was formed from four civil parishes: St Mary Magdalen Bermondsey, St Mary Rotherhithe, Southwark St John Horsleydown and Southwark St Olave and St Thomas. In 1904 these four were combined into a single civil parish called Bermondsey, which was conterminous with the metropolitan borough.

Previous to the borough's formation it had been administered by three separate local bodies: St Olave District Board of Works, Bermondsey Vestry and Rotherhithe Vestry.

The Victorian vestry hall on Spa Road, SE16, was bombed during the Second World War. After the war the neighbouring Municipal Offices (1928, designed by H Tansley) took over the role. Bermondsey Town Hall continued to house civic offices, latterly for Southwark Council, until being sold off in 2012.

The population declined sharply after the Second World War, being cut by about half from 1931 to 1951.

== Geography ==
The area of the borough was 1,504 acres (6.1 km^{2}).

== Bermondsey Borough Council ==
A map showing the wards of Bermondsey Metropolitan Borough as they appeared in 1916.

The borough was divided into twelve wards for elections: No. 1 Bermondsey, No. 2 Bermondsey, No. 3 Bermondsey, No. 4 Bermondsey, No. 5 Bermondsey, No. 6 Bermondsey, No. 1 Rotherhithe, No. 2 Rotherhithe, No. 3 Rotherhithe, St John, St Olave and St Thomas.

=== Elections ===
In the first election to the borough council, held on 1 November 1900 the Moderates (supported by the Conservative party) gained a majority. The opposition group was formed by the Progressive Party. The Moderates retained their majority at the 1903 elections. In 1906 the Moderate group was renamed Municipal Reform. In 1909 The Progressives won 27 seats and the Independent Labour Party 1 to the Municipal Reform's 26 seats, but the latter party retained power through the aldermanic elections. They regained an overall majority of councillors at the 1912 elections.

Local elections were postponed during the First World War, with the next poll held in 1919. The results were a major reverse for the Municipal Reform party with just two councillors elected. The Progressives formed the largest party with 27 seats, followed by the Labour Party with 24. There was one independent councillor. At the 1922 elections Labour gained a majority with 38 seats. The opposition was formed by a Ratepayers Association with 14 councillors. Labour held the council at the subsequent elections, holding all the seats from 1934 to 1945 and from 1949 until the borough's abolition.

=== Coat of arms ===
The council was granted a coat of arms in 1901. The design included references to the three constituent authorities. The lion, crozier and two letters B represent Bermondsey vestry, and are derived from the insignia of Bermondsey Abbey. The crown and axe were the emblem of St Olave's District Board of Works, and were derived from the royal arms of Norway, Saint Olave being the anglicised name of King Olaf II of Norway. The ship represented Rotherhithe and the Surrey Commercial Docks. The symbolism in the coat of arms were incorporated into a sculpture called The Bermondsey Lion that was unveiled in The Blue in 2011.

The Latin motto adopted by the borough was Prosunt gentibus artes or "Arts profit the people", and was adapted from Ovid's Metamorphoses.

== Population ==
The population from the Census returns was:

Constituent parishes 1801–1899

Year	1801	1811	1821	1831	1841	1851	1861	1871	1881	1891
Population	46,281	49,397	57,148	62,637	68,701	85,308	101,913	122,398	134,632	136,660

Metropolitan Borough 1900-1961

Year	1901	1911	1921	1931	1941	1951	1961
Population	130,760	125,903	119,452	111,542		60,638	51,860

== Parliamentary representation ==
For elections to the UK Parliament, the borough was divided into the two constituencies of Bermondsey and Rotherhithe. In 1918 the boundaries of Rotherhithe were adjusted, and Bermondsey was redrawn and renamed Bermondsey West. In 1950 the borough's representation was reduced to one Bermondsey constituency.
