= Thomas Keyse =

English painter

Thomas Keyse (1722–1800) was an English still-life painter, and the proprietor of Bermondsey Spa.

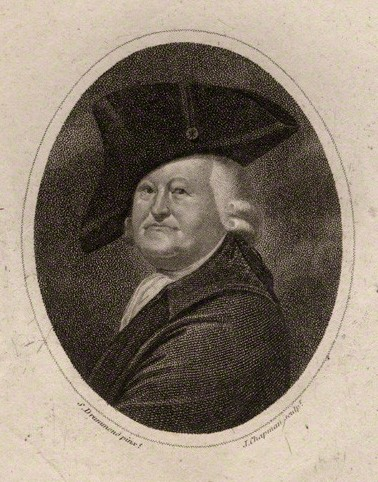
Thomas Keyse, 1797 engraving

== Life ==
A self-taught artist, Keyse was a member of the Free Society of Artists, and exhibited with them from 1761 to 1764; he painted still life, flowers or fruit. From 1765 to 1768 he was an occasional exhibitor at the Society of Artists, and twice sent pictures to the Royal Academy. In 1768 he obtained a premium from the Society of Arts for a new method of setting crayon drawings.

About 1770 Keyse opened a tea-garden in Bermondsey, then a suburb of London, where a chalybeate spring had been found, and which became known as the Bermondsey Spa. Here, with other attractions, Keyse kept a permanent exhibition of his own drawings. Obtaining a music license, he made the gardens an imitation of the Vauxhall Pleasure Gardens, open in the evening during the summer months, and provided fireworks, including a set-piece of the siege of Gibraltar, constructed and designed by Keyse himself.

Keyse died at his gardens 8 February 1800, in his seventy-ninth year. The gardens remained open for about five years longer, and gave their name to Spa Road in Bermondsey.

== See also ==
- Bermondsey Spa Gardens

== Notes ==
Attribution

This article incorporates text from a publication now in the public domain: Lee, Sidney, ed. (1892). "Keyse, Thomas". Dictionary of National Biography. Vol. 31. London: Smith, Elder & Co.
