= The Blue =

Market place in Bermondsey, London

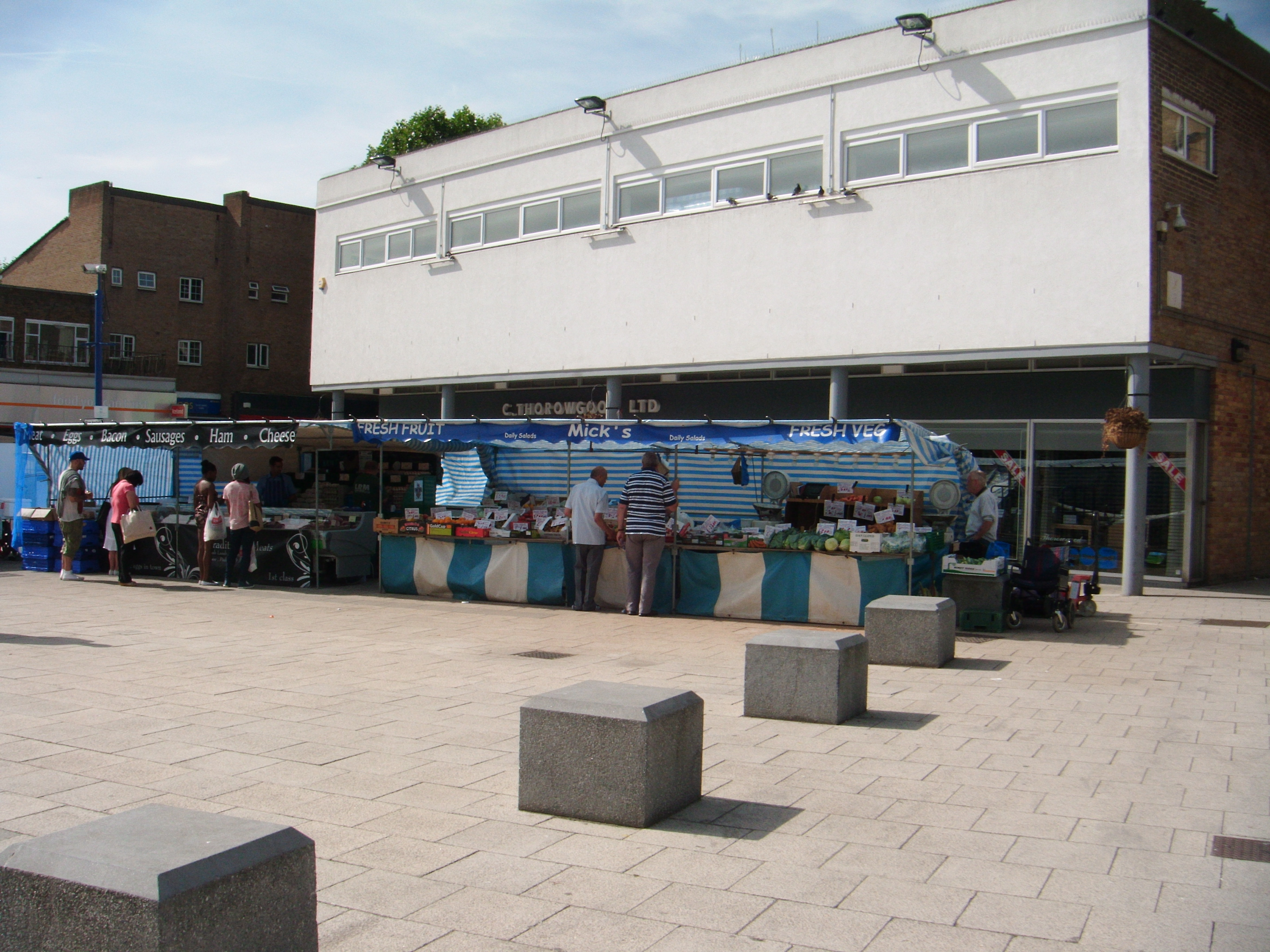
- Market stalls in The Blue
- Location: Southwark Park Road; Bermondsey, Southwark, Greater London; 51.4926°N 0.0637°W
- Management: Southwark London Borough Council
- Owner: Southwark London Borough Council
- Environment: Outdoor
- Goods sold: General goods
- Days normally open: Monday–Saturday
- Number of tenants: 24
- Interactive map of The Blue

The Blue is a central market place in Bermondsey, southeast London. The market is open Monday to Saturday from 9 am until 5 pm and has about 10 stall holders, selling food and clothes. The area has been known locally as The Blue for more than two hundred and thirty years and is probably named after the original Blue Anchor public house that gave its name to Blue Anchor Lane. The market has capacity for 24 stalls.

Immediately north of Blue Anchor Lane on an arched viaduct are the multiple railway tracks of the Brighton and South East Main Lines. The Blue Anchor Lane joins St. James's Road where the viaduct arches to the immediate north west contain the remnants of the disused Spa Road railway station which was the original terminus of London's first railway.

In 2005 a Metropolitan Police report described the area as a crime hotspot for "race crime and youth disorder". In October 2014 The Blue became a Business Improvement District (BID).

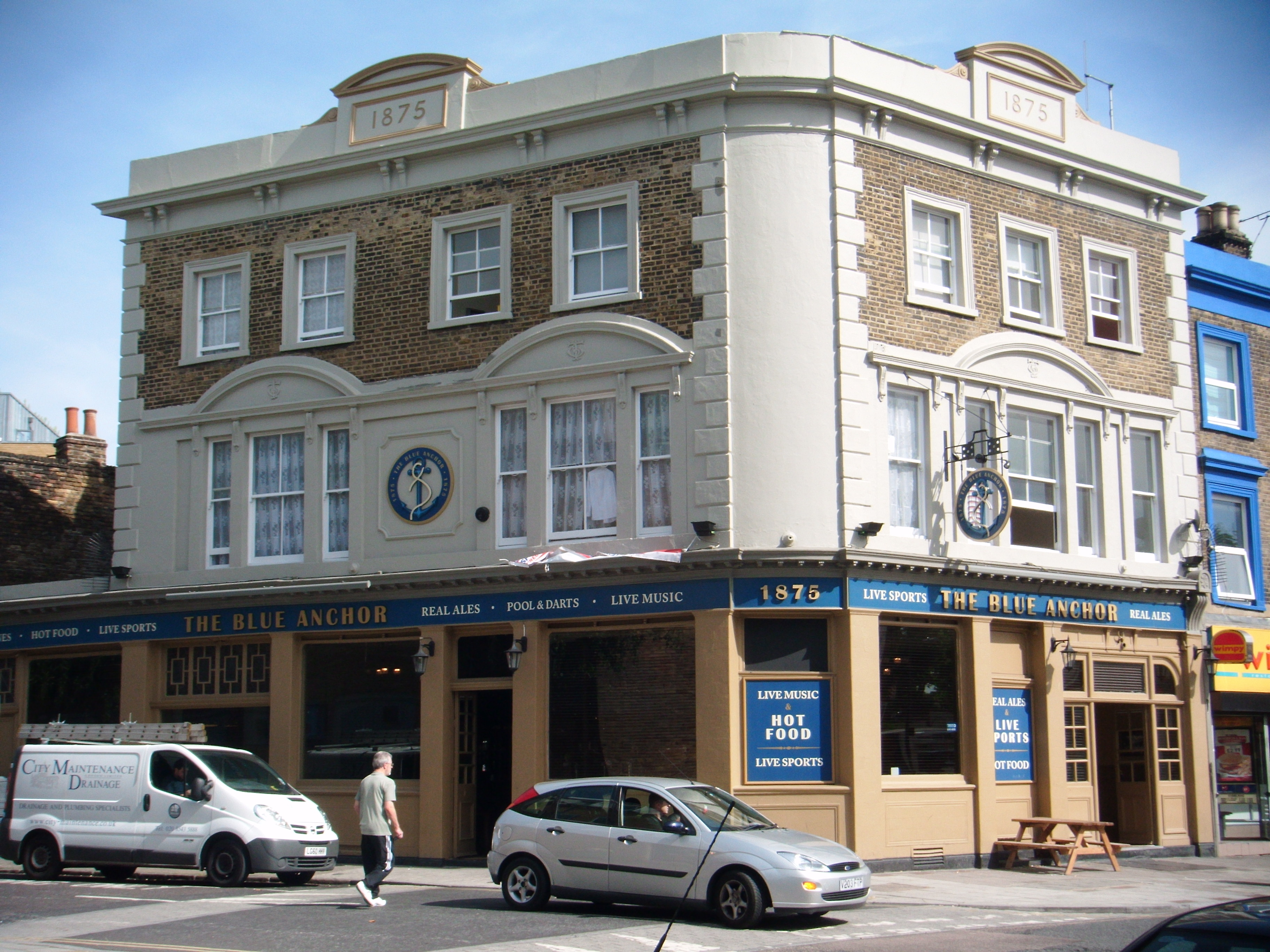
The Blue Anchor pub built in 1876. The area known as The Blue was probably named after a previous tavern of the same name, probably on this site.

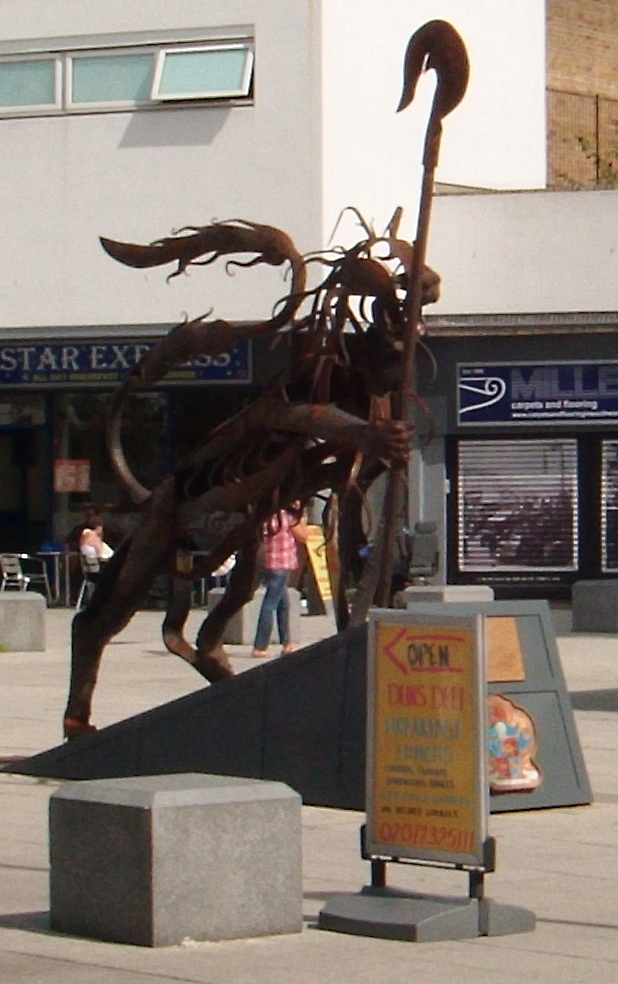
This representation of the Bermondsey Lion was created by Kevin Boys for Southwark Council. It was unveiled on 16 July 2011.

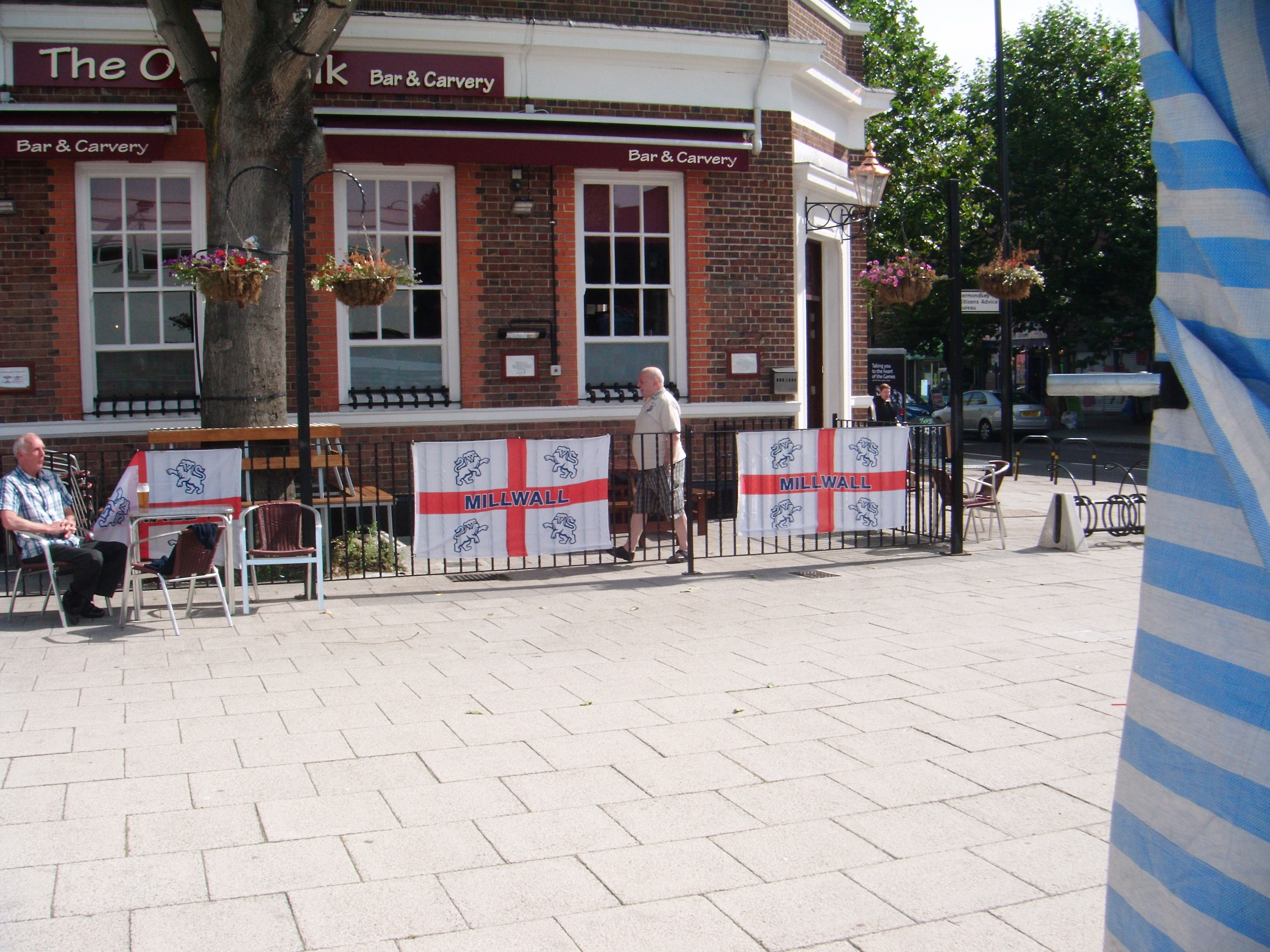
The Old Bank pub is situated on the corner of the square and Southwark Park Road. The flags represent support for England and Millwall Football Club whose ground The Den is close to The Blue.

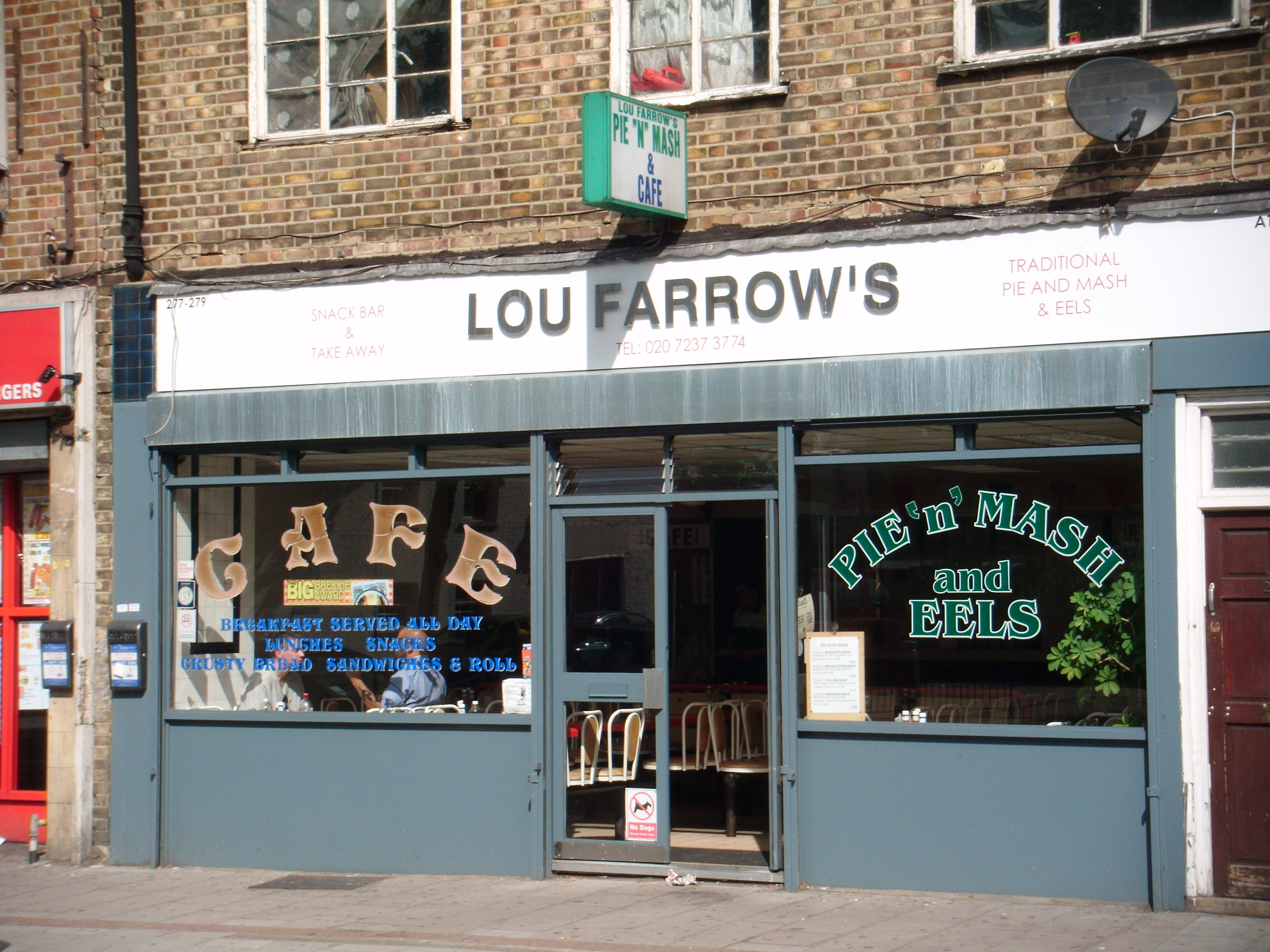
A Pie and mash shop on Southwark Park Road in The Blue. Pie, mash and eels is a traditional dish in the East End and South East London.
