= Spa Road, Bermondsey =

Street in London, England

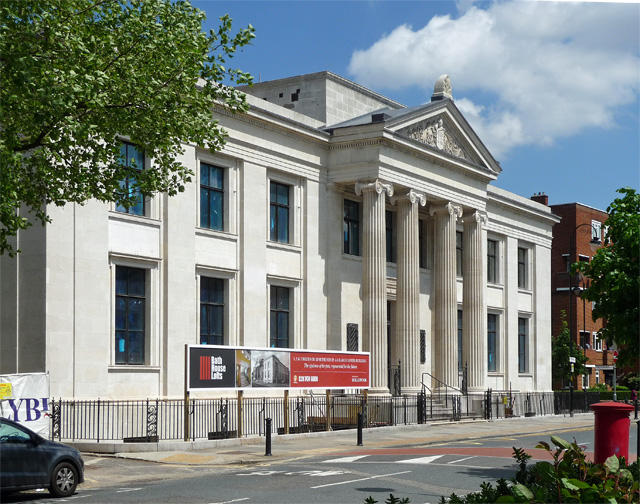
The former Bermondsey Town Hall.

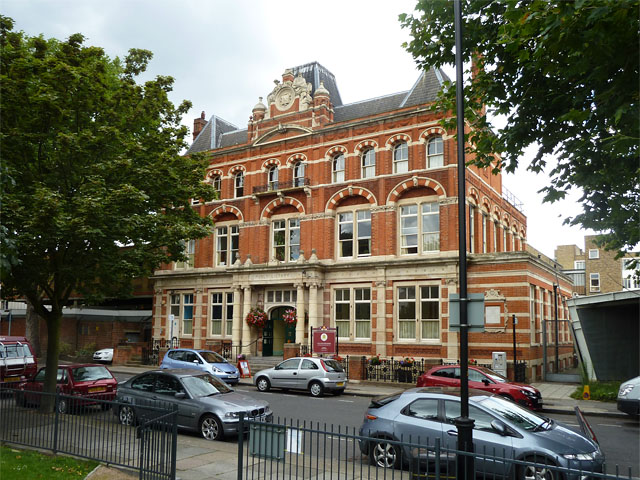
The former Bermondsey Public Library.

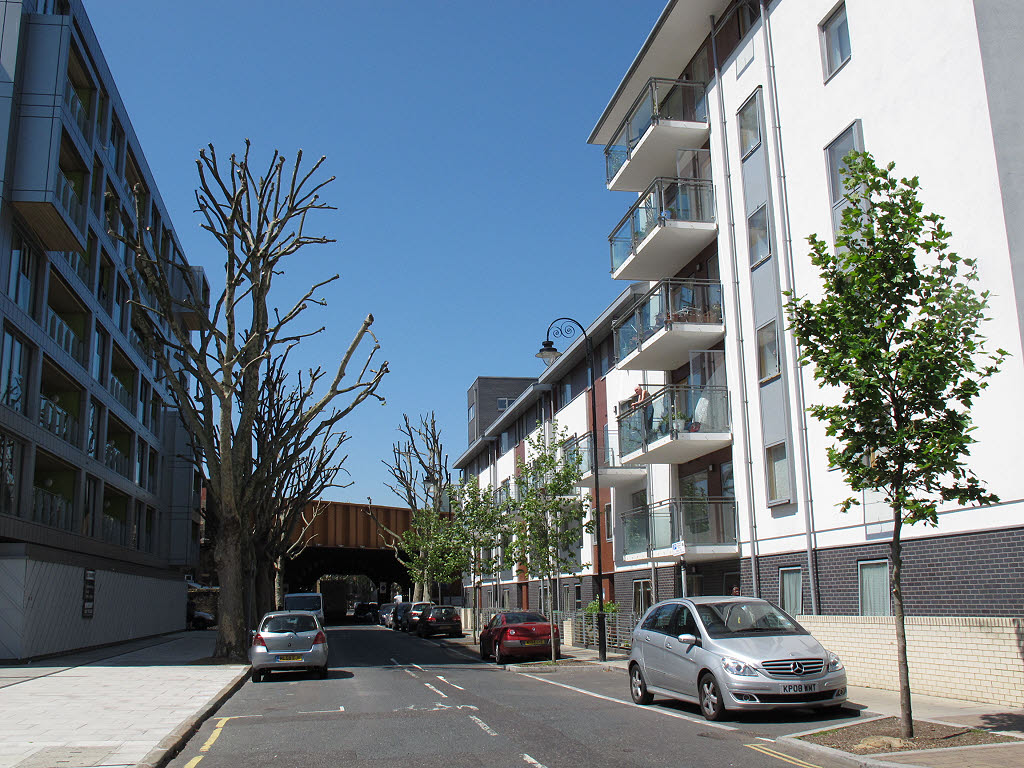
Newer buildings at the eastern end of the street near the railway viaduct.

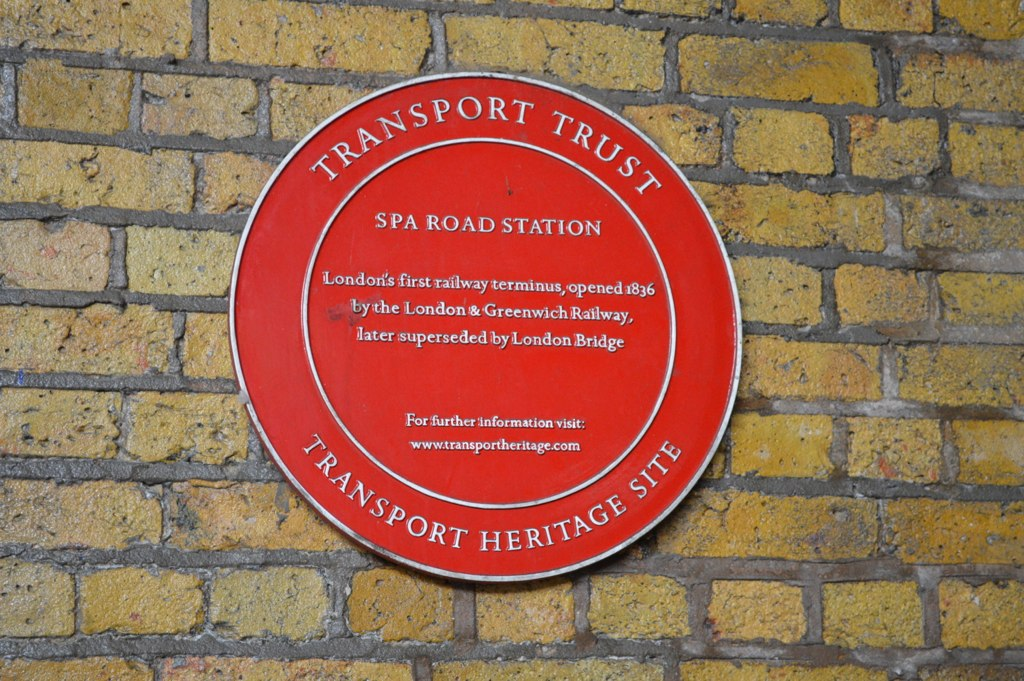
Red plaque commemorating the historic Spa Road railway station.

Spa Road is a street in Bermondsey in the London Borough of Southwark. It takes it name from the historic Bermondsey Spa, developed by the painter Thomas Keyse after mineral springs were discovered there in the eighteenth century. Bermondsey Spa Gardens is located at its western end at the site of the former Spa. It contains the former Bermondsey Town Hall, built in 1930, that was the headquarters of the old Bermondsey Borough. This replaced an older building dating back to the 1880s. Nearby is the former Bermondsey Public Library, a red brick building dating from the 1890s.

Spa Road railway station was located at the eastern end of the street and was the original terminus of the capital's first railway the London and Greenwich Railway when it opened in 1836. It was rebuilt twice and relocated across the street before closing to passengers in 1915. The viaduct carrying trains from or towards London Bridge station still crosses the street.

== Bibliography ==
- Bebbington, Gillian. London Street Names. Batsford, 1972.
- Cherry, Bridget & Pevsner, Nikolaus. London 4: South. Yale University Press, 2002.
- Tambling, Jeremy. Going Astray: Dickens and London. Routledge, 2018.
