= Bermondsey =

District in London, England

Coordinates: 51.4986°N 0.0757°W

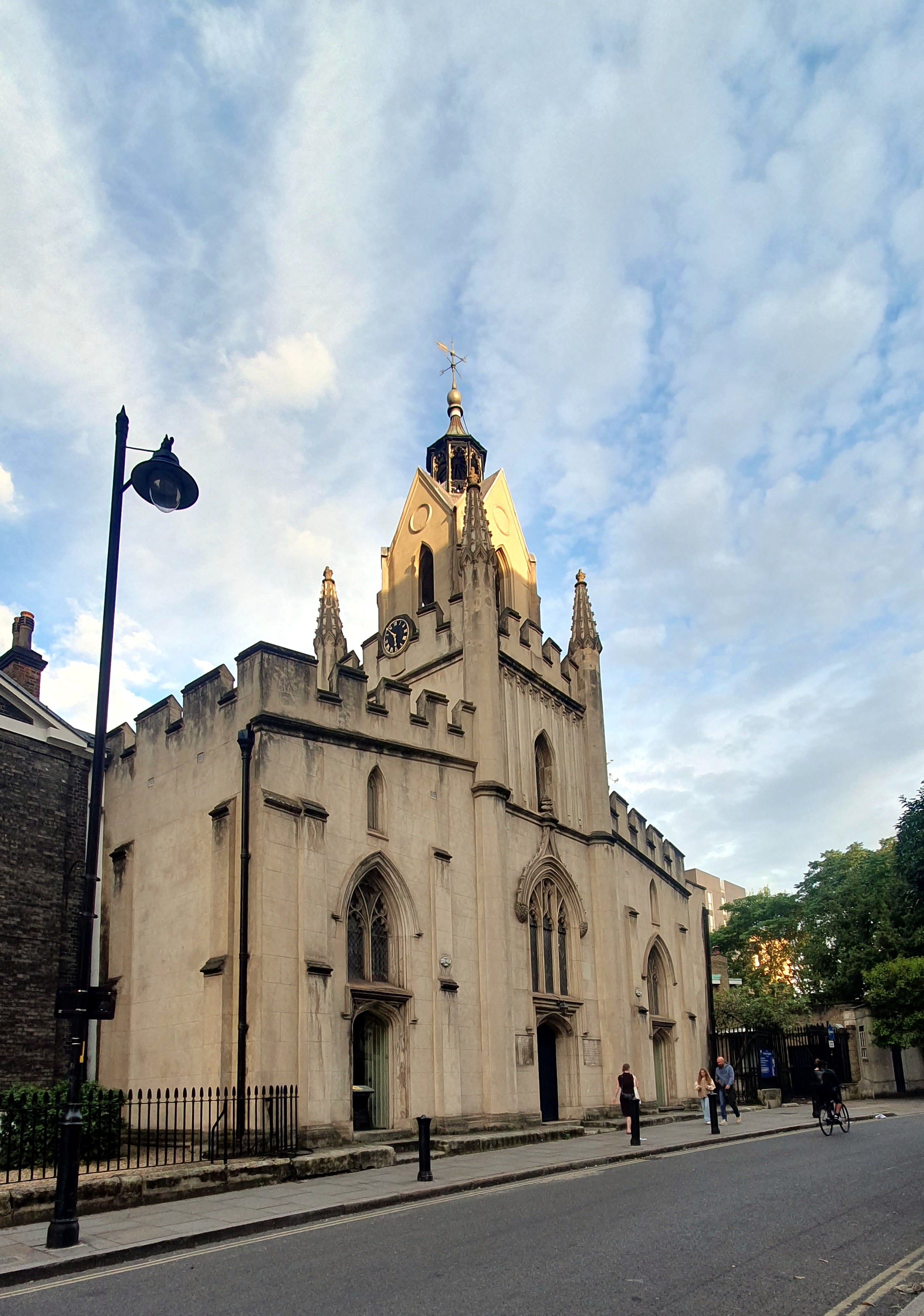
- St Mary Magdalen Church, Bermondsey

- Location within Greater London
- OS grid reference: TQ335795
  - Charing Cross: 2.5 mi (4.0 km) WNW
- London borough: Southwark
- Ceremonial county: Greater London
- Region: London
- Country: England
- Sovereign state: United Kingdom
- Post town: LONDON
- Postcode district: SE16, SE1, SE15
- Dialling code: 020
- Police: Metropolitan
- Fire: London
- Ambulance: London
- UK Parliament: Bermondsey and Old Southwark
- London Assembly: Lambeth and Southwark

Bermondsey (/ˈbɜːrməndzi/ BUR-mənd-zee) is a district in southeast London, part of the London Borough of Southwark, England, 2 1/2 miles (4 kilometres) southeast of Charing Cross. To the west of Bermondsey lies Southwark, to the east Rotherhithe and Deptford, to the south Walworth and Peckham, and to the north is Wapping across the River Thames. It lies within the historic county boundaries of Surrey. During the Industrial Revolution Bermondsey became a centre for manufacturing, particularly in relation to tanning. More recently it has experienced regeneration including warehouse conversions to flats and the provision of new transport links.

== History ==
=== Toponymy ===
Bermondsey may be understood to mean Beornmund's island; but, while Beornmund represents an Old English personal name, identifying an individual once associated with the place, the element "-ey" represents Old English eg, for "island", "piece of firm land in a fen", or simply a "place by a stream or river". Thus Bermondsey need not have been an island as such in the Anglo-Saxon period, and is as likely to have been a higher, drier spot in an otherwise marshy area. Though Bermondsey's earliest written appearance is in the Domesday Book of 1086, it also appears in a source which, though surviving only in a copy written at Peterborough Abbey in the 12th century, claiming "ancient rights" unproven purporting to be a transcription of a letter of Pope Constantine (708–715), in which he grants privileges to a monastery at Vermundesei, then in the hands of the abbot of Medeshamstede, as Peterborough was known at the time.

=== Anglo-Saxon and Norman period ===
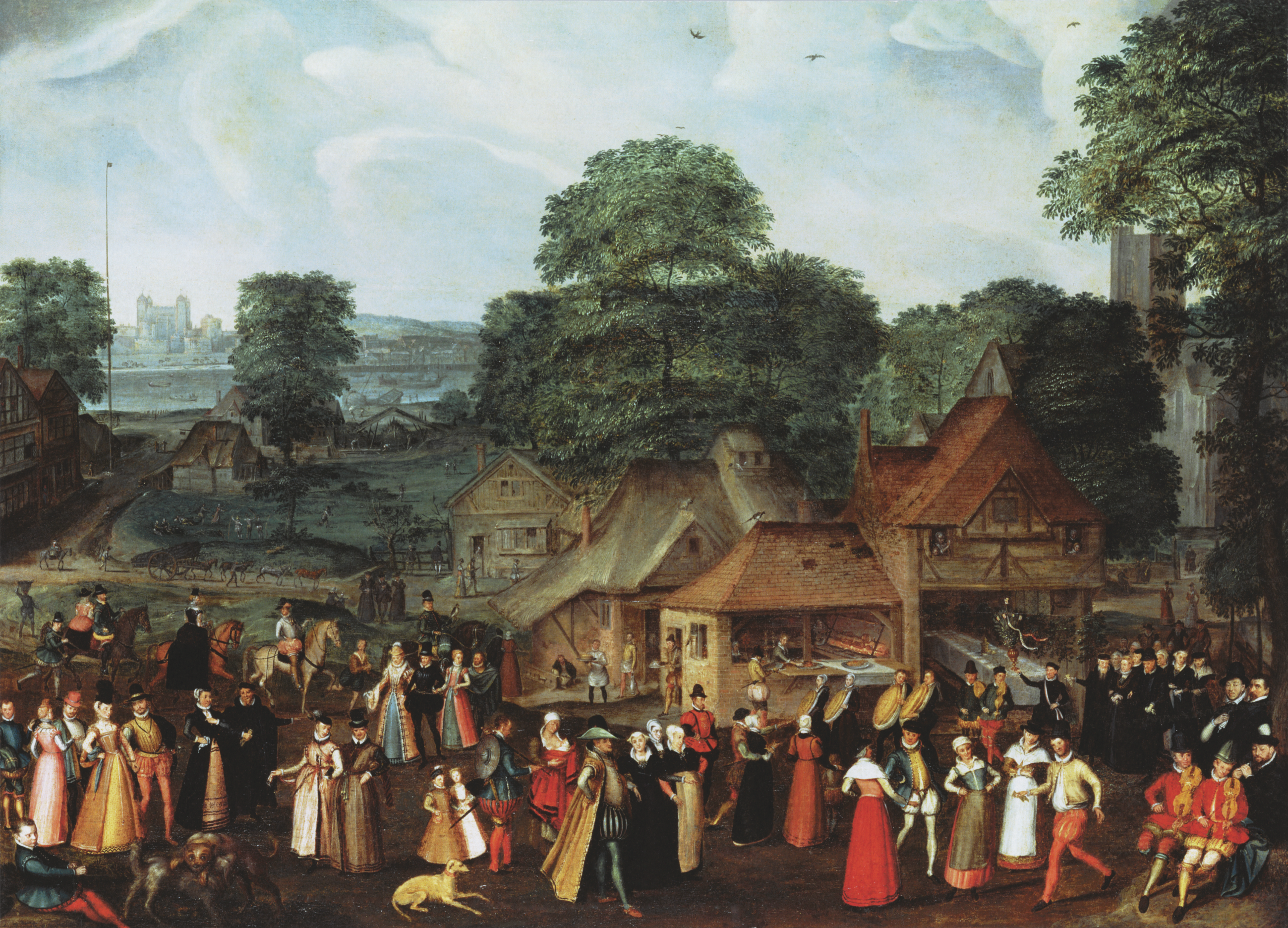
A Fête at Bermondsey (1571) by Marcus Gheeraerts the Elder, with the Tower of London in the distance at left.

Bermondsey appears in the Domesday Book as Bermundesy and Bermundesye, in the Hundred of Brixton within the County of Surrey. It was then held by King William, though a small part was in the hands of Robert, Count of Mortain, the king's half brother, and younger brother of Odo of Bayeux, then earl of Kent. Its Domesday assets were recorded as including 13 hides, 'a new and handsome church', 5 ploughs, 20 acres (8 hectares) of meadow, and woodland for 5 pigs. It rendered £15 in total. It also included interests in London, in respect of which 13 burgesses paid 44d (£0.18).

The church mentioned in Domesday Book was presumably the nascent Bermondsey Abbey, which was founded as a Cluniac priory in 1082, and was dedicated to St Saviour. Monks from the abbey began the development of the area, cultivating the land and embanking the riverside. They turned an adjacent tidal inlet at the mouth of the River Neckinger into a dock, named St Saviour's Dock after their abbey. But Bermondsey then was little more than a high street ribbon (the modern Bermondsey Street), leading from the southern bank of the Thames, at Tooley Street, up to the abbey close.

The Knights Templar also owned land here and gave their names to one of the most distinctive streets in London: Shad Thames (a corruption of "St John at Thames"). Other ecclesiastical properties stood nearby at Tooley Street (a corruption of "St Olave's"), owned by the priors of Lewes, St Augustine's, and Canterbury, as well as the abbot of Battle. These properties are located within the Archbishop of Canterbury's manor of Southwark, where wealthy citizens and clerics had their houses.

=== 14th century ===
King Edward III built a manor house close to the Thames in Bermondsey in 1353. The excavated foundations are visible next to Bermondsey Wall East, close to the famous Angel public house.

=== Early Modern period ===
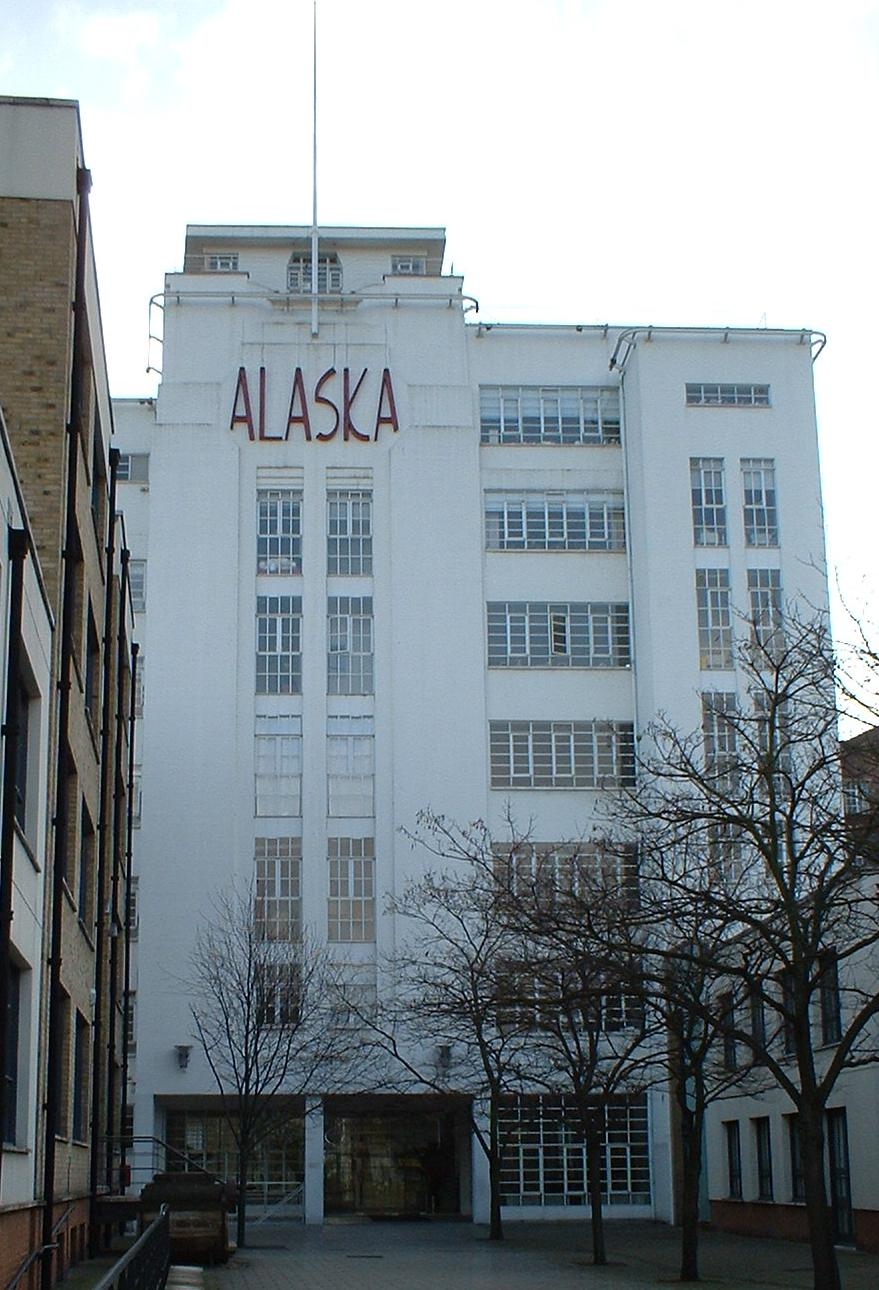
Former Alaska factory in Bermondsey

As it developed over the centuries, Bermondsey underwent some striking changes. After the Great Fire of London, it was settled by the well-to-do, and took on the character of a garden suburb especially along the line of Grange Road and Bermondsey Wall East as it became more urbanised. A pleasure garden was constructed during the Restoration period in the 17th century, commemorated by the Cherry Garden Pier. Samuel Pepys once visited here.

A rare surviving building from this period is St Mary Magdalen Church in Bermondsey Street, completed in 1690 (although a church has been recorded on this site from the 13th century). This church survived the 19th-century redevelopment phase and the Blitz unscathed. It is an unusual survivor for Bermondsey as buildings of this period are relative rarities in Inner London in general.

In the 18th century, the discovery of a spring from the river Neckinger in the area led to the development of Bermondsey Spa, as the area between Grange and Jamaica Roads called Spa Road commemorates. A new church was built for the growing population of the area, and named St John Horsleydown.

=== Industrial era ===
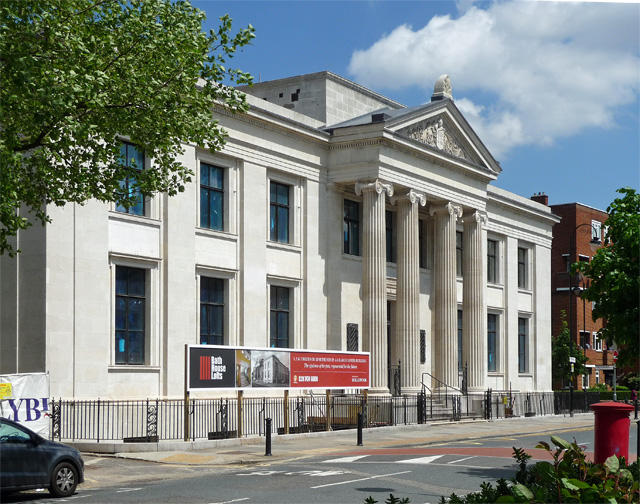
The former Bermondsey Town Hall

Bermondsey was one of London's major industrial centres. It was the chief centre for the leather trade and tannery industry, food processing and manufacture, and the heart of the provisions trade in London. Colloquially the area has been known as "larder of London", "biscuits town", and the "land of leather" reflecting the influence of these industries. While many of these industries have declined, their factories, warehouses and wharfs, and institutions remain significant in the area's built heritage and local landmarks, and are reflected in street and building names.

It was from the Bermondsey riverside that the painter J. M. W. Turner executed his famous painting of The Fighting "Temeraire" Tugged to her Last Berth to be Broken Up (1839), depicting the veteran warship being towed to Rotherhithe to be scrapped.

By the mid-19th century factories sprang up, most notably the landmark factories of Alaska Factory (originally opened by fur merchants C.W. Martin & Sons Ltd in 1869 for the processing of the Alaskan sealskin fur), Salt, cheese and Hartley's Jam. Parts of Bermondsey, especially along the riverside, had become notorious slums with the arrival of industrial plants, docks and immigrant housing. The area around St. Saviour's Dock, known as Jacob's Island, was considered one of the worst slums in London. It was immortalised in Charles Dickens's novel Oliver Twist, in which the villain, Bill Sikes, meets his end in the mud of 'Folly Ditch', in reference to Hickman's Folly, which surrounded Jacob's Island. Dickens provides a vivid description of what it was like:

... crazy wooden galleries common to the backs of half a dozen houses, with holes from which to look upon the slime beneath; windows, broken and patched, with poles thrust out, on which to dry the linen that is never there; rooms so small, so filthy, so confined, that the air would seem to be too tainted even for the dirt and squalor which they shelter; wooden chambers thrusting themselves out above the mud and threatening to fall into it—as some have done; dirt-besmeared walls and decaying foundations, every repulsive lineament of poverty, every loathsome indication of filth, rot, and garbage: all these ornament the banks of Jacob's Island.

Bermondsey vestry hall was built on Spa Road in 1881 but was severely damaged by bombing during the Blitz in 1941. It was demolished soon thereafter. The original vestry hall was extended to create the Bermondsey Town Hall in 1930. The area was extensively redeveloped during the 19th century and early 20th century with the expansion of the river trade and the arrival of the railways. London's first passenger railway terminus was built by the London to Greenwich Railway in 1836 at London Bridge. The first section to be used was between the Spa Road Station and Deptford High Street. This local station had closed by 1915.

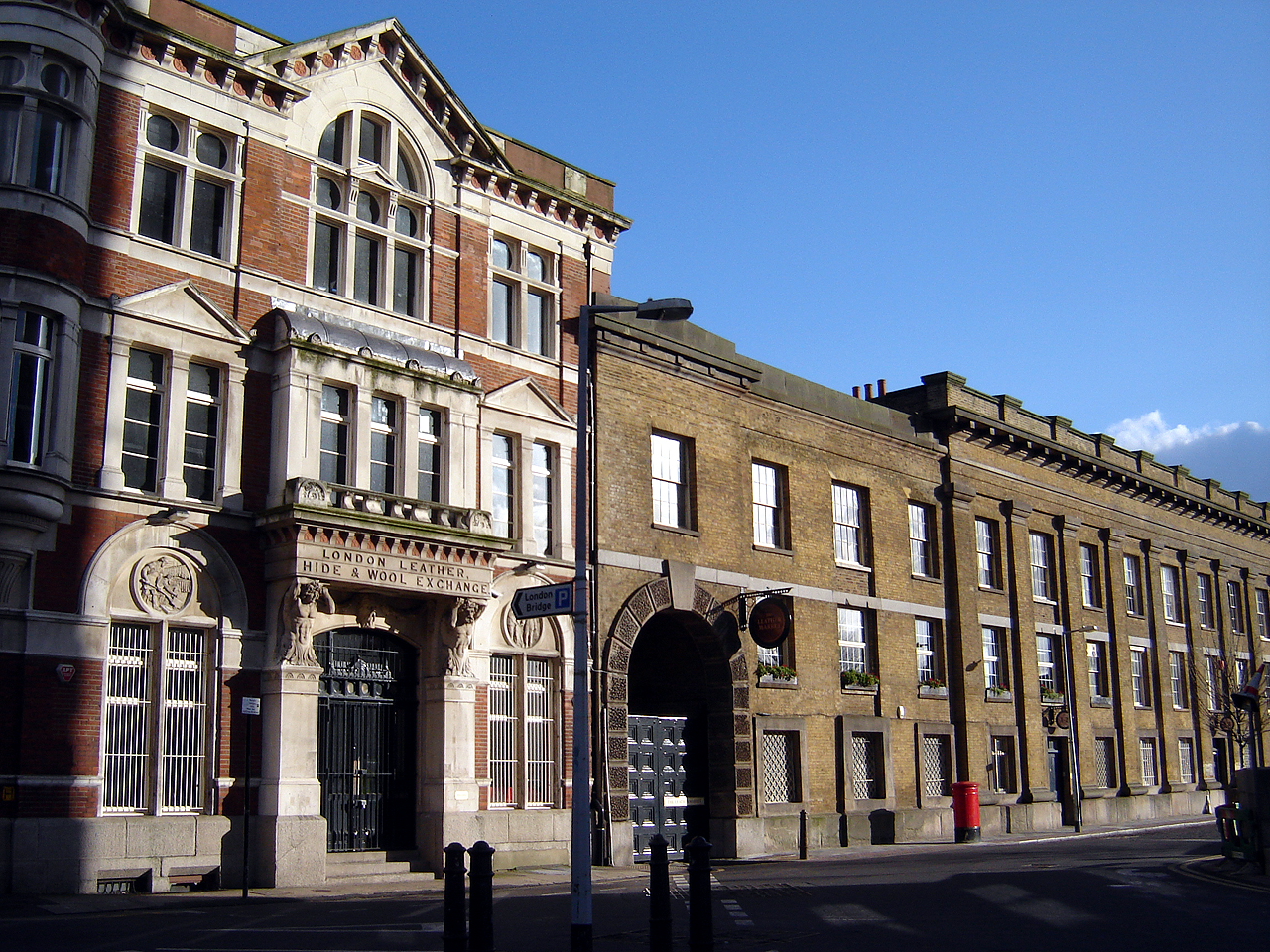
Leather, Hide and Wool Exchange, at left and Leather Market at right

The industrial boom of the 19th century was an extension of Bermondsey's manufacturing role in earlier eras. As in the East End, industries that were deemed too noisome to be carried on within the narrow confines of the City of London had been located here – one such that came to dominate central Bermondsey, away from the riverfront, was the processing and trading of leather and hides. Many of the warehouse buildings from this era survive around Bermondsey Street, Tanner Street, Morocco Street and Leathermarket Street including the huge Leather Market of 1833 and the Leather, Hide and Wool Exchange of 1878; virtually all are now residential and small work spaces or offices. Hepburn and Gale's tannery (disused as of early 2007) on Long Lane is also a substantial surviving building of the leather trade. The Exchange building had a fine private club, effectively a gentlemen's club for the leading merchants and manufacturers. In 1703 they had acquired a royal charter from Queen Anne to gain a monopoly of trading and training of apprentices for within 30 miles (50 kilometres) of the ancient parish, similar to a City livery company, the Bermondsey tanners.

Peek, Frean and Co was established in 1857 at Dockhead, Bermondsey by James Peek and George Hender Frean. They moved to a larger plant in Clements Road in 1866, leading to the nickname 'Biscuit Town' for Bermondsey, where they continued baking until the brand was discontinued in 1989. The former biscuit factory site was renamed as the Pearl Yard Bermondsey in 2025, and is being redeveloped into 1,600 new homes by Greystar.

Bermondsey, specifically Blue Anchor Lane, was also the location of the world's first food canning business, established in 1812, by Donkin, Hall and Gamble.

=== The Bermondsey battalions ===
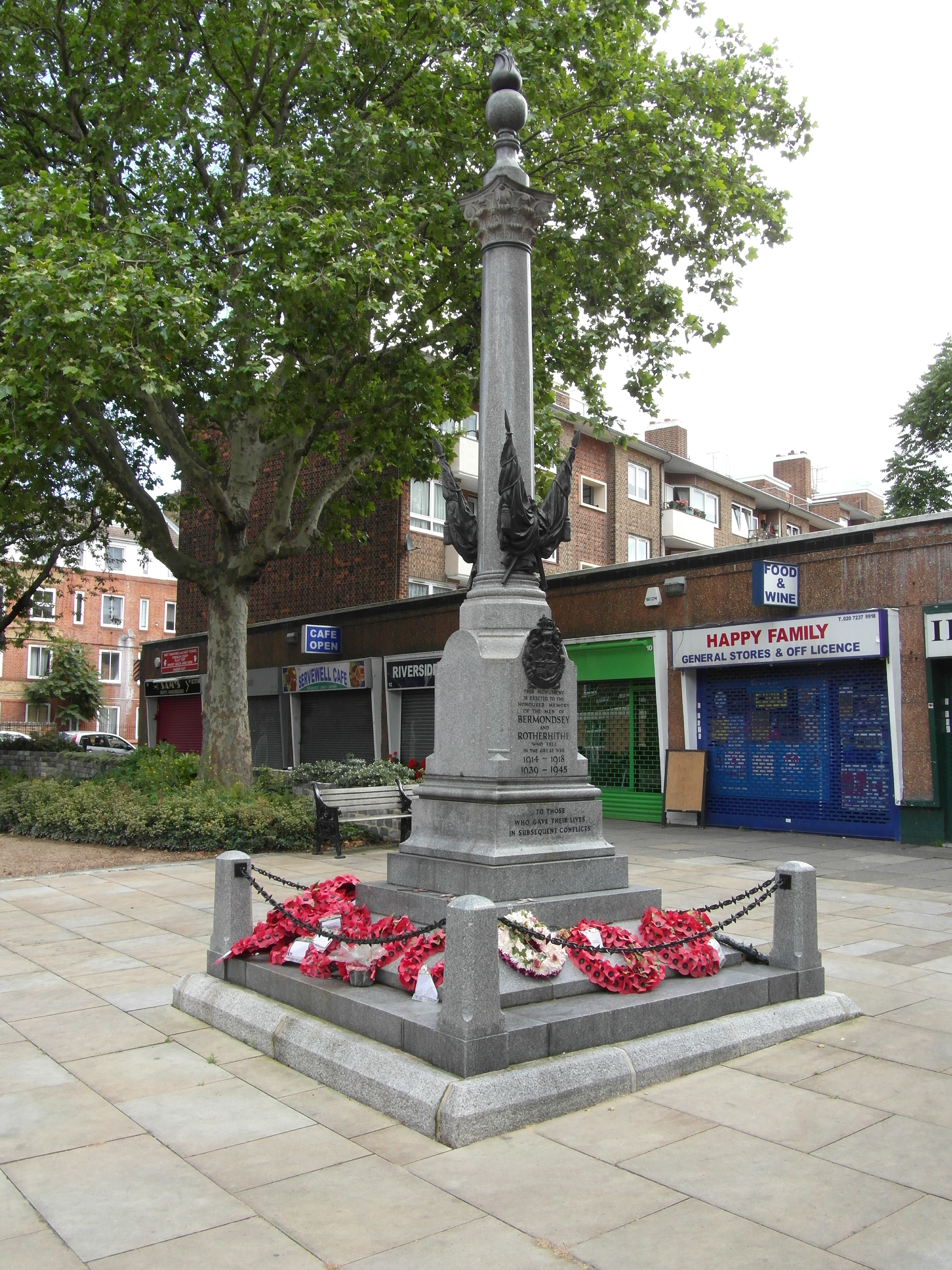
The Bermondsey and Rotherhithe War Memorial off Jamaica Road.

During the Napoleonic Wars volunteer units were formed for home defence, including the 'Old' and 'New' Bermondsey Volunteers (existing in 1799) and the Rotherhithe Volunteers in 1803. After another invasion scare, the 10th (Bermondsey) and 23rd (Rotherhithe) Surrey Rifle Volunteer Corps were formed in 1860–61. Together they became a volunteer battalion of the Queen's (Royal West Surrey Regiment) in 1883, with its drill hall in Jamaica Road. When the Territorial Force was created in 1908 this became the 22nd Battalion, London Regiment (Queen's). After the outbreak of World War I in 1914 it expanded to three battalions, of which the 1/22nd served on the Western Front and the 2/22nd in Palestine.

Following the success of the recruitment campaign for 'Kitchener's Army' in 1914, Lord Kitchener asked the mayors of the Metropolitan boroughs of the County of London if they could raise more 'Pals battalions' drawn from their localities. Despite Bermondsey already supporting the 22nd Londons, the Mayor and Borough Council agreed to form another infantry battalion, which became the 12th (Service) Battalion, East Surrey Regiment (Bermondsey). The men wore the coat of arms of Bermondsey as their collar badge. A number of them were recruited from the 'Black Hand Gang', a notorious Bermondsey street gang of the era, and they proved so skilful at Trench raiding that 'Black Hand Gang' became a nickname for the whole battalion. It served on the Western Front: when the first tanks went into action at the Battle of Flers–Courcelette on 15 September 1916, an aircraft saw the 12th East Surreys following one to attack the village and sent back the famous report: 'A tank is walking down the high street of Flers with the British Army cheering behind'.

Following World War I, the 12th East Surreys were disbanded and the 22nd Londons were reformed in the Territorial Army (TA). The London Regiment was abolished in 1937 and the battalion reverted to being the 6th (Bermondsey) Battalion, The Queen's. During World War II it again formed a second battalion, and both served in the Battle of France and North Africa. The 1/6th was at the Battle of Alamein and then served with the 7th Armoured Division (the 'Desert Rats') in Italy and North West Europe, while the 2/6th were with the 56th (London) Division in Italy. In 1961 the 6th Queen's amalgamated with the other TA battalions of the Queen's Regiment.

=== 20th century ===
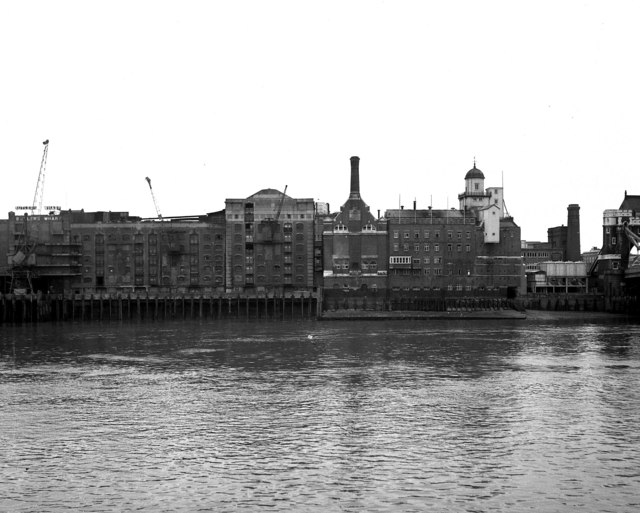
Butler's Wharf and Courage Brewery, 1971

To the east of Tower Bridge, Bermondsey's 3 1/2 mi (5.5 km) of riverside were lined with warehouses and wharves, of which the best known is Butler's Wharf. They suffered severe damage in World War II bombing and became redundant in the 1960s following the collapse of the river trade. After standing derelict for some years, many of the wharves were redeveloped under the aegis of the London Docklands Development Corporation during the 1980s. They have now been converted into a mixture of residential and commercial accommodations and have become some of the most upmarket and expensive properties in London. In 1997, US President Bill Clinton and Prime Minister Tony Blair visited the area to dine at the Le Pont de la Tour restaurant at Butler's Wharf.

At the same time more everyday housing was constructed in the areas north of the Old Kent Road, including several council estates.

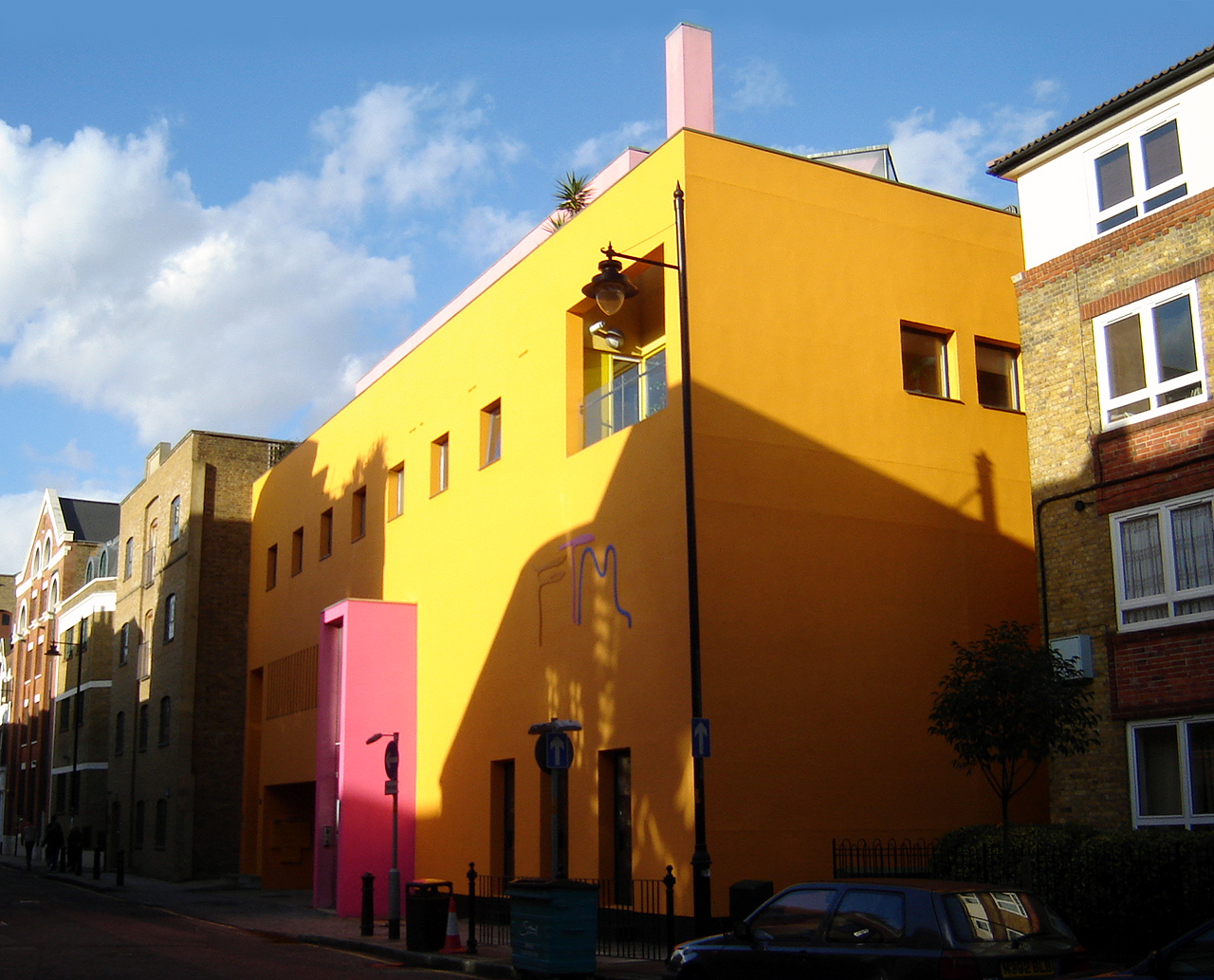
Bermondsey Fashion and Textiles Museum (March 2007)

Bermondsey was served by London's first railway, from Spa Road railway station, as part of the London Bridge to Greenwich line, and the junction of lines from Croydon and Kent at South Bermondsey. However, reorganisation of lines and temporary closure of stations left Bermondsey's transport links with the rest of London poorer in the late Twentieth Century. This was improved in 2000 with the opening of Bermondsey Underground station on the London Underground's Jubilee Line Extension and the East London Line extension as part of the London Overground.

The Blue serves as the central market place for Bermondsey as a whole.

Wee Willie Harris, known as "Britain's wild man of rock 'n' roll", came from Bermondsey and had worked as a pudding mixer at Peek Freans. He is usually credited as the first British rock and roll player.

=== Local government ===
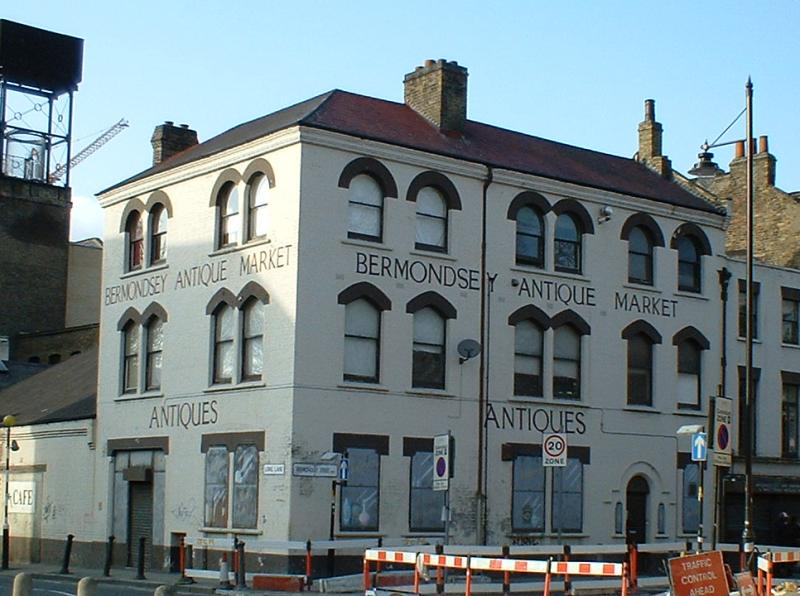
Bermondsey Antiques Market

The first 'Bermondsey' is that known as the location of an Anglo-Saxon monastery, and known from later charters to be the area around the post-Conquest Bermondsey Abbey and its manor, which was in turn part of the medieval parish. References in the Parliamentary Rolls describe it as "in Southwark".[] A later, Victorian civil parish of Bermondsey did not include Rotherhithe or St Olave's; this was the arrangement under the Metropolis Management Act 1855. The Southwark parishes of St Olave's and St John's Horsleydown (the latter a 'daughter' of the former) with St Thomas's formed a parish union ('District Board of Works') known as 'St Olave's' from that date. This was the arrangement within the London County from 1889. In 1899 St Olave and St Thomas's District was created as a single civil parish and the next year, following London government reorganisation, this was merged with Rotherhithe and part of Deptford to form, with Bermondsey civil parish, the Metropolitan Borough of Bermondsey. The Borough's first Mayor was Samuel Bourne Bevington (1832–1907), leather producer and one of the area's largest employers; his statue still stands in Tooley Street. This borough was incorporated into the London Borough of Southwark, in the Greater London reorganisation of 1965. For elections to the Greater London Council, Bermondsey was part of the Southwark electoral division until 1973 and then the Bermondsey electoral division until 1986.

==== Parish ====
Bermondsey St Mary Magdalen
- Ancient parish
- Area
  - 1851: 688 acres (2.78 km^{2})
  - 1901: 626 acres (2.53 km^{2})
- Population
  - 1801: 17,169
  - 1851: 48,128
  - 1901: 82,483
- Density
  - 1851: 70/acre
  - 1901: 132/acre
- History
  - Origin: Ancient parish
  - Abolished: 1965
  - Succeeded by: Coterminous with Metropolitan Borough of Bermondsey from 1904; Replaced by London Borough of Southwark
- Status: Civil parish
- Government: Vestry of the Parish of Bermondsey (1855—1900)
  - HQ: Vestry Hall, Spa Road

The ancient parish (also known as St. Mary Magdalen, Bermondsey) was part of Hundred of Brixton and County of Surrey. In 1855, it was included in the area of responsibility of the Metropolitan Board of Works (MBW). The Metropolis Management Act 1855, establishing the MBW, also incorporated a new elected local authority for the parish known as The Vestry of the Parish of Bermondsey in the County of Surrey.

The population of the parish in 1896 was 84,632, and it had adopted the Public Libraries Act 1850 in 1887. For electoral purposes, the parish was divided into four wards and had 120 elected vestrymen.

In 1889, the area of the Metropolitan Board was reconstituted as the County of London, and Bermondsey was transferred to the new county. In 1900, the County of London was divided into twenty-eight metropolitan boroughs. The parish became the core part of the Metropolitan Borough of Bermondsey, which also covered the parish of Rotherhithe, and the area of the St Olave's District Board of Works (consisting of the two parishes of Southwark St John Horsleydown and Southwark St Olave and St Thomas). A borough council replaced the vestries and board, and in 1904, all four parishes in the borough were merged as the single civil parish of Bermondsey.

===== Ecclesiastical parish =====
The ancient parish, dedicated to St Mary Magdalene and centred on the church of St Mary Magdalen Bermondsey, was in the Diocese of Winchester until 1877, then the Diocese of Rochester until 1905, and then finally in the Diocese of Southwark. From 1840, as the population of Bermondsey increased, a number of new parishes were formed:

- St James, Bermondsey in 1840
- Christ Church, Bermondsey in 1845
- St Paul, Bermondsey in 1846
- St Anne, Bermondsey in 1871
- St Crispin, Bermondsey in 1875
- St Augustine of Hippo, South Bermondsey in 1878
- St Andrew, Bermondsey in 1882
- St Luke, Bermondsey in 1885.

In addition, as the population of neighbouring Camberwell increased, parts of Bermondsey parish were included in the new parish of

- St Philip, Avondale Square in 1876 with parts of St Giles, Camberwell

===== Bermondsey Vestry =====
A map showing the wards of Bermondsey Metropolitan Borough as they appeared in 1916.

Under the Metropolis Management Act 1855 any parish that exceeded 2,000 ratepayers was to be divided into wards; as such the incorporated vestry of St Mary Magdalen Bermondsey was divided into four wards (electing vestrymen): No. 1 (9), No. 2 (9), No. 3 (9) and No. 4 (9).

In 1894 as its population had increased the incorporated vestry was re-divided into six wards (electing vestrymen): No. 1 (21), No. 2 (24), No. 3 (21), No. 4 (21), No. 5 (18) and No. 6 (15).

== Governance ==
A map showing the wards of Bermondsey Metropolitan Borough as they appeared in 1916.

Southwark London Borough Council has divided the borough into a number of community council areas. The wards of London Bridge and West Bermondsey, North Bermondsey and South Bermondsey form the Bermondsey Community Council area.

Bermondsey's parliamentary representation has fluctuated with its population. Since at least the 13th century, it had formed part of the Surrey County seat until the 1868 Reform Act when it became part of Southwark constituency. From 1885 to 1918, a separate Bermondsey constituency existed, which included part of the older Southwark constituency. 1918 saw the seat split between two new constituencies: Rotherhithe and Bermondsey West, both of which were in place until the 1950 general election when the old Bermondsey seat was recreated.

In 1983, the area played host to a famous Bermondsey by-election in which Labour's Peter Tatchell lost the previously safe Labour seat to the Liberal Simon Hughes on a swing of 44%, which remains the largest by-election swing in British political history. Hughes represented the area until 2015 when he was defeated by the Labour candidate Neil Coyle. At the 1983 general election that took place several months after the by-election, a new Southwark and Bermondsey constituency was created, becoming North Southwark and Bermondsey in 1997, and in 2010 Bermondsey and Old Southwark (although a small part of south east Bermondsey is transferred to Camberwell and Peckham in the 2010 changes).

== Sport ==
Millwall Football Club was originally formed in 1885, in Millwall on the Isle of Dogs, East London. They retained the name, even though they moved across the river to New Cross, South East London in 1910. In 1993 they moved to their current stadium, The Den. The team has a strong local following, but has never been based in Bermondsey. The stadium lies right on the border of Southwark, but falls under the Borough of Lewisham. The nearest railway station is at South Bermondsey, which is a five-minute walk away.

== Geography ==
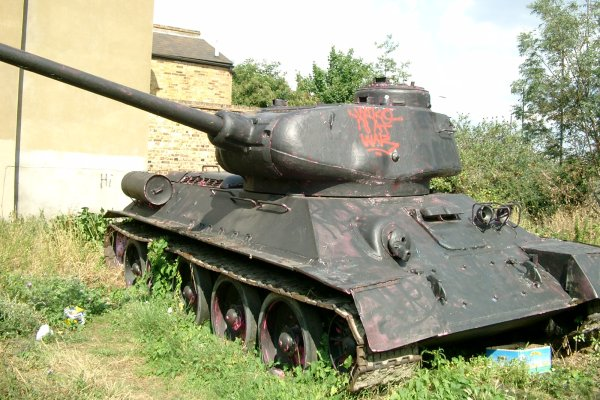
Mandela Way T-34 Tank

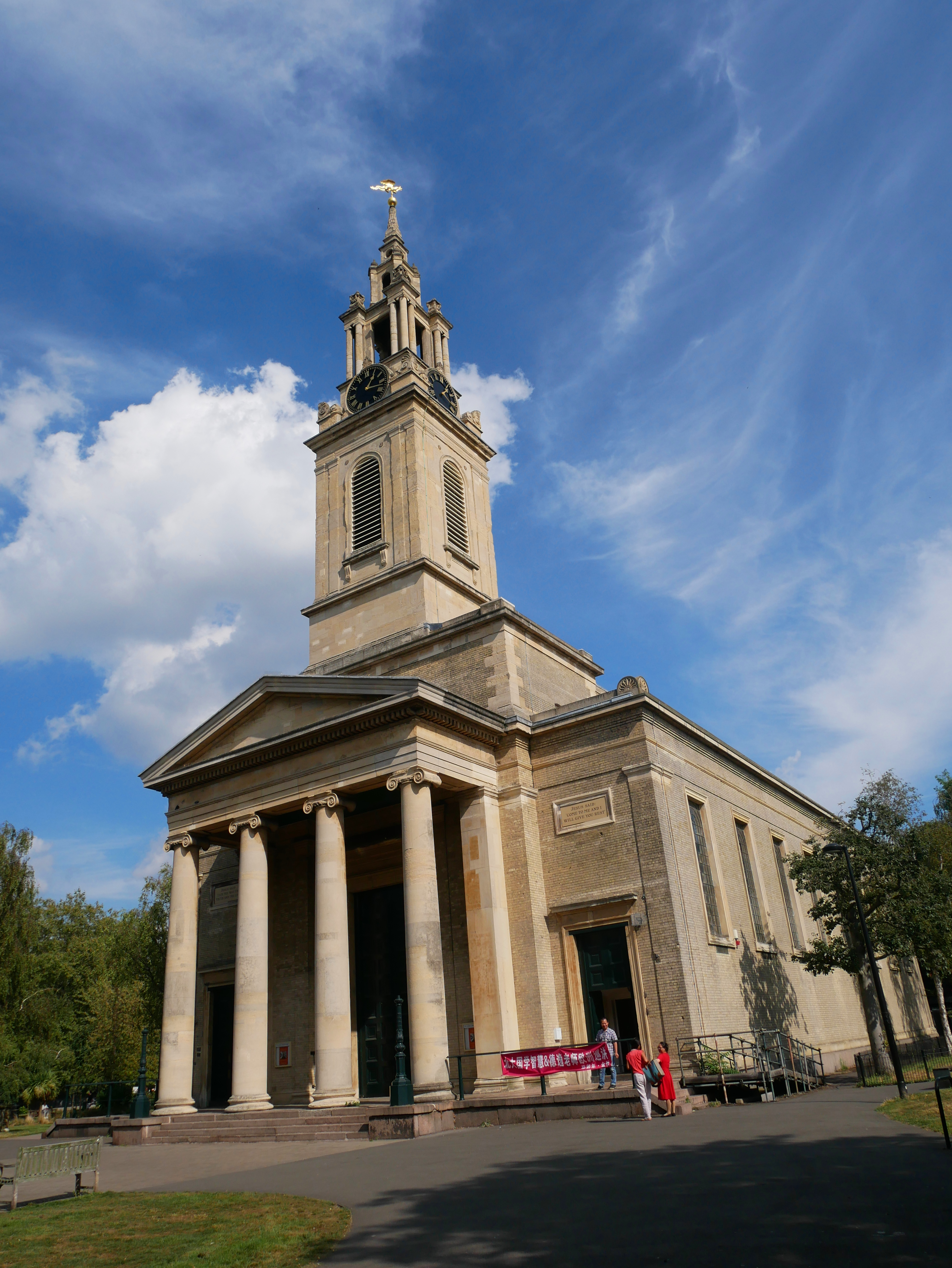
The Church of Saint James in Bermondsey, built in the 1820s

=== Places of interest ===
- Maltby Street Market
- Bermondsey antiques market
- Fashion and Textile Museum
- Shad Thames
- Mandela Way T-34 Tank
- Miloco Studios
- Bermondsey Spa Gardens
- Kagyu Samye Dzong, Tibetan Buddhist Centre
- Millwall F.C.
- The Shard
- London Bridge
- HMS Belfast
- Rouel Road
- Tower Bridge

=== Nearest places ===
- City of London
- Whitechapel
- Borough
- Peckham
- Canary Wharf
- Deptford
- Poplar
- Rotherhithe
- New Cross
- Wapping
- Camberwell
- Walworth

== Transport ==
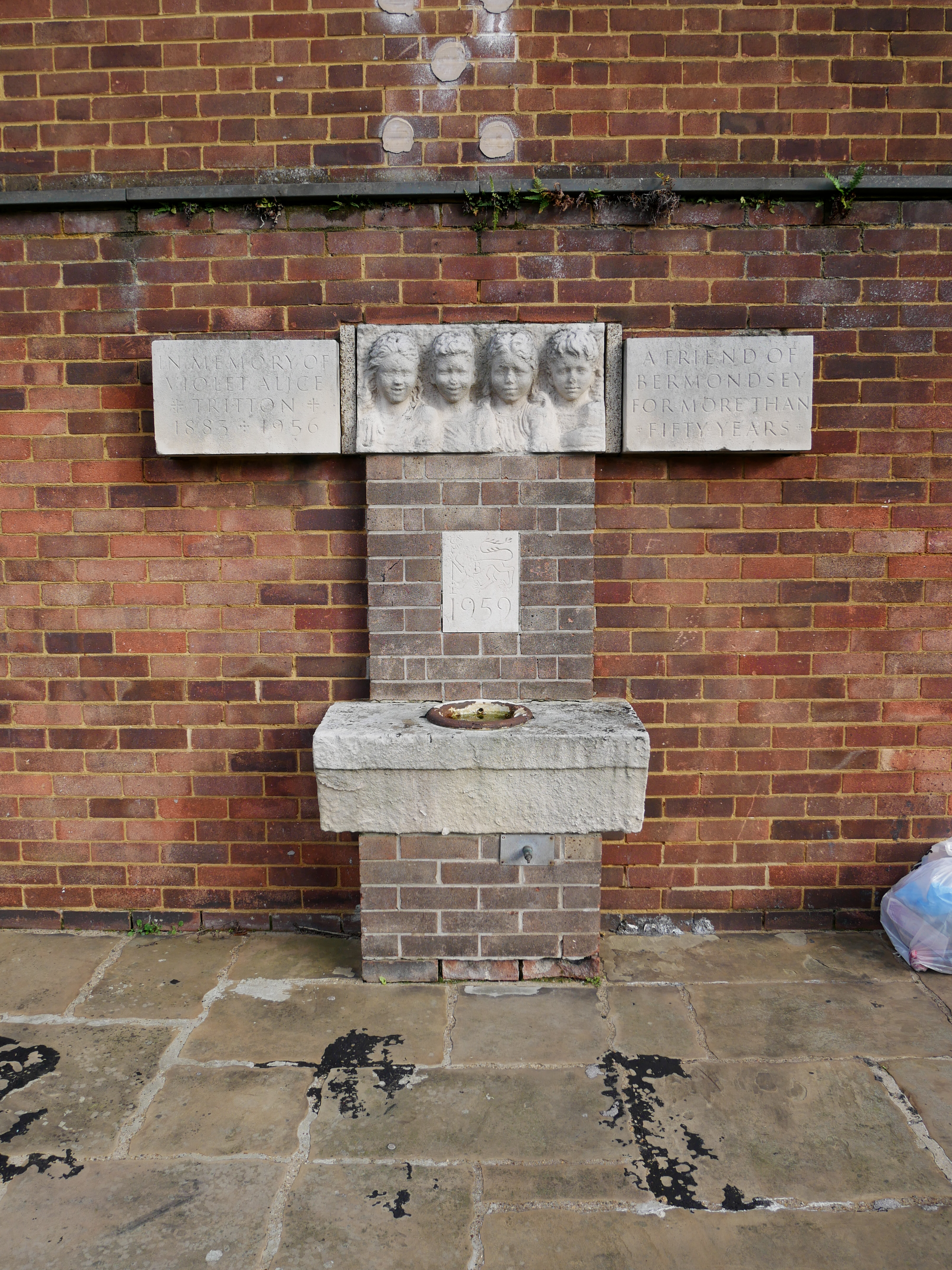
The 1950s Tritton memorial drinking fountain on St Saviour's Estate

=== Rail ===
There are several railway stations in and around Bermondsey. Bermondsey is in London Zone 2, but nearby London Bridge and Borough stations are in London fare zone 1. Oyster Cards can be used for travel from stations in Bermondsey to other stations in the London region.

==== London Underground ====
The Jubilee line passes through Bermondsey, calling at Bermondsey and Canada Water stations. London Bridge station on the Jubilee and Northern lines, and Borough on the Northern line are also nearby.

The Jubilee line provides a direct link from Bermondsey to Canary Wharf and Stratford in East London, and to Waterloo, the West End, Baker Street and north west London towards Willesden and Stanmore. The Northern line from London Bridge links the area to Kennington, Clapham and Morden in the south west. Northbound services travel through the City of London, King's Cross St Pancras and Camden Town, towards Edgware or High Barnet.

==== National Rail & London Overground ====
The East London line, South London line and South Eastern Main Line all pass through Bermondsey, providing frequent rail connections to Central London and South East England.

London Bridge is the busiest station in the locale, and fourth busiest station in the UK, with 48.5 million passenger entries and exits in 2017–18. Services from London Bridge are provided by Southeastern, Thameslink and Southern. London Bridge connects Bermondsey directly to destinations in Central London, including Waterloo, Charing Cross, Cannon Street, Farringdon and St Pancras International. Beyond London, trains travel direct to Gatwick and Luton airports, and destinations including Bedford, Brighton, Cambridge, Dover, Peterborough and Sevenoaks.

South Bermondsey is served by Southern trains from London Bridge to South London, with direct connections to Beckenham Junction, Crystal Palace and Croydon.

Rotherhithe, Canada Water and Surrey Quays are all served by London Overground trains. These stations link Bermondsey with Dalston and Highbury & Islington to the north. To the south, Bermondsey is linked directly to New Cross, West Croydon, Crystal Palace, and Clapham Junction.

Queens Road Peckham & Peckham Rye stations, just south of Bermondsey, Peckham Rye is also an interchange served by London Overground, Southeastern, Thameslink and Southern, with direct trains to London Victoria. While Queens Road Peckham station is in-between Peckham Rye and South Bermondsey stations providing London Overground and Southern services.

=== Bus connections ===
London Buses routes 1; 42; 47; 78; 188; 381; C10 and P12 and night routes N1; N47; N199 and N381 all serve the Bermondsey and South Bermondsey area.

=== Road ===
Several of London's arterial routes pass through Bermondsey, including:

- the A100 (Tower Bridge Road) – the London Inner Ring Road towards the City and Tower Bridge;
- the A101 (Rotherhithe Tunnel) – to Limehouse, Canary Wharf, the A13 and destinations in Essex;
- the A2 (Great Dover Street/Old Kent Road) – to the M25, destinations in Kent and the Channel Tunnel;
- the A200 (Jamaica Road/Lower Road) – to London Bridge and Deptford;
- the A202 (New Kent Road) – the London Inner Ring Road towards Elephant & Castle and the A3;
- the A2206 (Southwark Park Road);
- the A2208 (Rotherhithe New Road).

Bricklayer's Arms is a busy road junction between the London Inner Ring Road (A100/A202) and the A2, where routes from London Bridge meet with routes towards the East End, Surrey and Kent.

The southern portal of the Rotherhithe Tunnel (A101) is in Bermondsey. The Tunnel was completed in 1908 and carries vehicle traffic from Bermondsey directly to the East End. In 2003, the Tunnel was rated the tenth most dangerous tunnel in Europe, owing in parts to its age and lack of safety features.

The London Borough of Southwark maintains most roads, particularly residential streets, but Transport for London (TfL) manages certain routes: the A100; the A101 (Rotherhithe Tunnel); the A2; the A200; the A202.

==== Air pollution ====
The local authority say that vehicle exhaust fumes are the main source of air pollution in Southwark. Roadside air pollution levels are monitored by the local authority in Bermondsey. Results from 2017 suggest that Bermondsey has some of the highest nitrogen dioxide (NO_{2}) levels in the Borough. NO_{2} concentration was particularly high near the Rotherhithe Tunnel, along Jamaica Road and on Old Kent Road:

2017 nitrogen dioxide data in Bermondsey
Diffusion tube location	2017 Average NO_{2} level (μg/m3)
SDT 4 – Rotherhithe Old Road	55.99
SDT 62 – Bosco College, Jamaica Road	70.43
SDT 63 – Rotherhithe Tunnel Approach	94.31
SDT 88 – Lamppost 52, Jamaica Road	61.41
SDT 90 – 375, Old Kent Road	62.02

All the above sites failed to meet national air quality objectives.

A monitoring site on Old Kent Road registered an annual mean 22 μg/m-3 in 2017 for PM10 (particulates often found in exhaust), which meets national air quality objectives.

=== Cycling ===
Bermondsey is well connected to the London and National Cycle networks, with several signed routes passing through the area. With several routes passing through Bermondsey, cycling infrastructure is maintained by both Transport for London (TfL) and Southwark Council. Most routes run through Bermondsey in an east–west direction.

List of cycle routes in Bermondsey
Route	Westbound	Eastbound	Notes
National Cycle Route 4 (NCN 4)	London Bridge, Bankside and Millbank Terminus: Fishguard, West Wales	Rotherhithe Terminus: Greenwich, London	NCN 4 runs east–west across Bermondsey. The route is predominantly carried by residential streets or shared-use paths. It is a signed route, running in parallel to the River Thames.
National Cycle Route 425 (NCN 425)	Camberwell	Rotherhithe	NCN 425 runs southwest–northeast across Bermondsey. The route is predominantly carried by residential streets or shared-use paths. It is a signed route, running non-stop from Camberwell to Rotherhithe.
EuroVelo 2 – "The Capitals Route" (EV2)	London Bridge, Bankside and Millbank Terminus: Galway, Ireland	Rotherhithe, Greenwich and the Lea Valley Terminus: Moscow, Russia	EV2 follows the course of NCN 4 through Bermondsey, predominantly on residential streets or shared-use paths. It is part of the EuroVelo network of cycle routes, running non-stop in the UK between Holyhead and Harwich.
Cycle Superhighway 4 (CS4) – Under Construction	Tower Bridge	Deptford, Greenwich	Transport for London (TfL) are currently building a continuous cycle route on two-way segregated cycle track between Tower Bridge and Greenwich, via Jamaica Road and Lower Street. Work began in 2019.
Quietway 1 (Q1)	Borough Terminus: Waterloo Bridge	Deptford Terminus: Greenwich	Q1 (South) runs from Waterloo Bridge to Greenwich through Bermondsey, non-stop. The route uses residential streets and quieter roads. Q1 passes to the south of South Bermondsey railway station.
Quietway 14 (Q14)	Borough Terminus: Blackfriars Bridge	Rotherhithe, Canada Water Terminus: Folkestone Gardens	Q14 runs non-stop between Blackfriars Bridge and Folkestone Gardens, Deptford on residential streets and quieter roads. The route is signed.

Santander Cycles bicycle sharing was extended to the area in 2020 with five new docking stations, serving the Cycleway 4 route that will connect Tower Bridge and Greenwich.

== See also ==
- List of people from Southwark
- List of schools in Southwark
- Bermondsey Market
