= Bermondsey tanners =

The Master, Wardens and Comonalty of the Art or Mistery of Tanners of the Parish of St Mary Magdalen Bermondsey of Surrey
- Motto: Planto Velieris In Tergus In Vermundesei - "Make Hide Into Leather In Bermondsey"
- Location: Suite 59 Centre Point, Rolls Road, Bermondsey, London SE1 5NX
- Date of formation: 1703 with Royal Charter
- Company association: Leather trades
- Master of company: 6 July 2026 - for year following: - Clair Fox
- Website: http://www.tannersofbermondsey.org

"The Master, Wardens and Comonalty of the Art or Mistery of Tanners of the Parish of St Mary Magdalen Bermondsey of Surrey" was incorporated by Royal Charter by Queen Anne on 15 July 1703. Its authority was to check on the quality of tanning within Bermondsey and an area of thirty miles from it and to apprentice suitable persons to qualify as tanners to a Master i.e. member of the company. It is therefore a guild.

Its practical authority and control of the trade was abolished by the Municipal Corporations Act 1835 but it remained a membership organisation and was largely an association of the leading Bermondsey tanning proprietors throughout the 19th Century. They created the Leather Market and the London Leather Exchange and gentlemen's club on Weston Street which buildings are still extant. These were the families of Bevington, Gale, Barrow, Hepburn and Enderby, among many others. Although the last remnant of the leather trade in Bermondsey was lost in 1990 when Barrow & Gale, the makers of the Maundy Money Purses and Red Boxes, relocated to Peckham, the guild remains to conduct its charitable activities through making educational and training bursaries, gifts and prizes to local youth and other worthy causes.

The Master, Upper Warden and Other Warden are elected and sworn into office "on 24th June or fourteen days thereafter" by and from the Court of Assistants who number between 14 and 24 members. The Clerk is meant to be 'learned in the Law'; the senior members do not wear gowns but Tanned Leather Aprons. This is done after a Thanksgiving Service in the ancient guild church of St Mary Magdalen, Bermondsey and is followed by a procession along Bermondsey Street to a nearby venue where a feast is held.

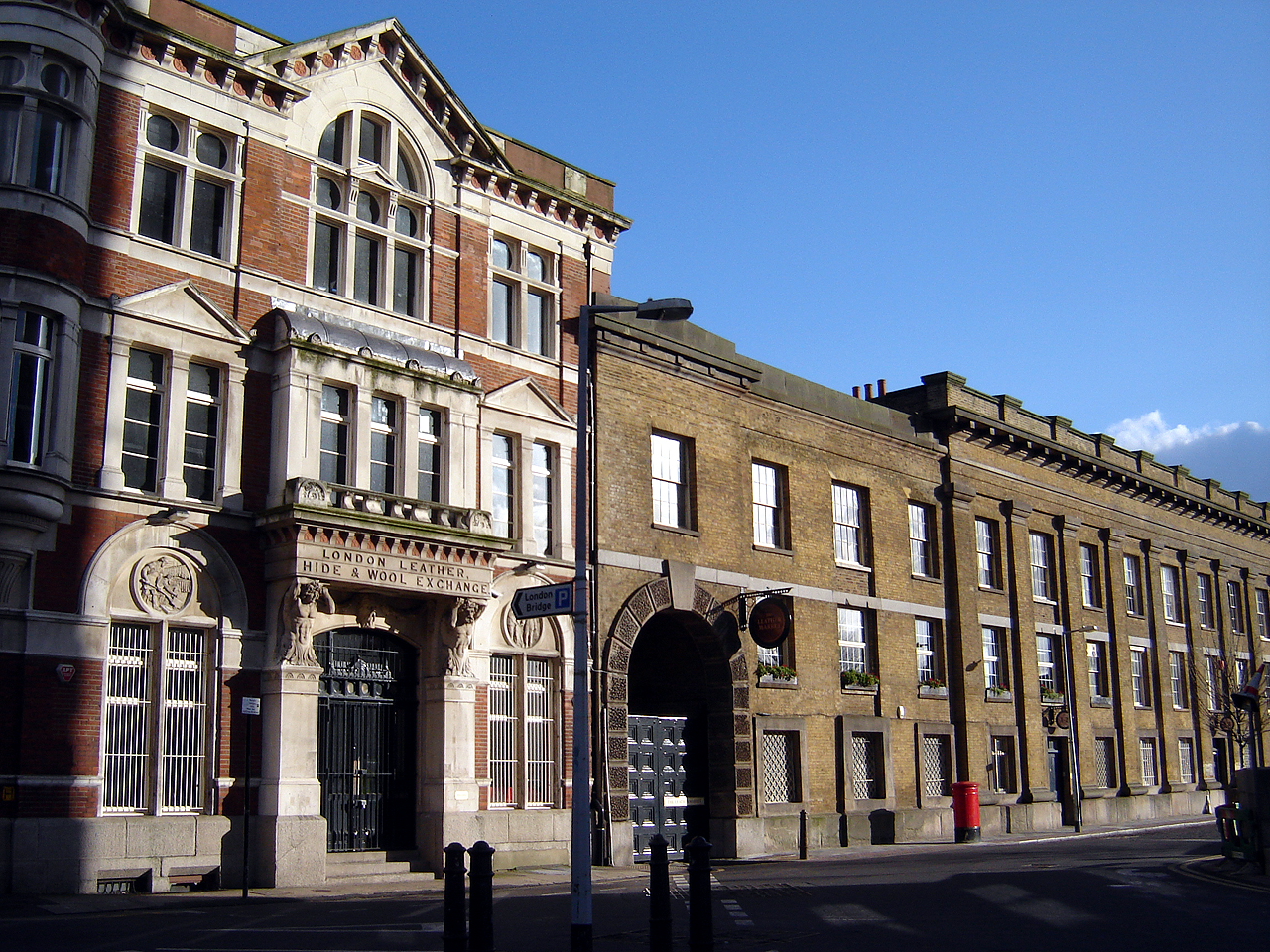
Leather, Hide and Wool Exchange, at left and Leather Market at right, Bermondsey
