= Hank Messick =

American journalist (1922–1999)

- Born: Henry Hicks Messick; August 14, 1922; Happy Valley, North Carolina, U.S.
- Died: November 6, 1999 (aged 77)
- Education: University of Iowa
- Occupations: Investigative journalist; author

Henry Hicks Messick (August 14, 1922 – November 6, 1999) was an American investigative journalist and author, specializing in writing about organized crime. He was best known for his biography of Meyer Lansky.

== Biography ==
Messick was born in Happy Valley, North Carolina. He received a master's degree from the University of Iowa. He started his journalism career working at several newspapers in North Carolina. From 1957 to 1963 he worked at the Louisville Courier-Journal where he reported on the extensive illegal gambling activities in Newport, Kentucky. From 1963 to 1966 he worked at the Miami Herald, where he investigated police corruption. He briefly worked for the Boston Traveler in 1967, but was fired after investigating the business activities of Joseph Linsey, one of the newspapers' shareholders and a former associate of mobster Charles "King" Solomon. He then worked full-time as an author, writing 19 books. He mostly wrote about organized crime in places outside New York City and Chicago, such as Kentucky, Florida, Bahamas, Cleveland and Hollywood.

He died at his home on 6 November 1999 aged 77 after a long battle with Sjogren's syndrome. He was survived by his wife Faye and three children.

== Bibliography ==
- 1967 The Silent Syndicate
- 1968 Syndicate in the Sun
- 1968 Syndicate Wife: The Story of Ann Drahmann Coppola
- 1969 Syndicate Abroad
- 1969 Secret File
- 1971 Lansky
- 1972 John Edgar Hoover: An Inquiry into the Life and Times of John Edgar Hoover and His Relationship to the Continuing Partnership of Crime, Business, and Politics
- 1972 The Mobs and the Mafia: The Illustrated History of Organized Crime (with Burt Goldblatt)
- 1973 The Private Lives of Public Enemies (with Joseph L. Nellis)
- 1974 The Beauties and the Beasts: The Mob in Show Business
- 1974 Gangs and Gangsters: The Illustrated History of Gangs from Jesse James to Murph the Surf (with Burt Goldblatt)
- 1975 Barboza (written with Joseph Barboza)
- 1974 Kidnapping: The Illustrated History from Its Origins to the Present (with Burt Goldblatt)
- 1976 The Only Game in Town: An Illustrated History of Gambling (with Burt Goldblatt)
- 1976 King's Mountain: The Epic of the Blue Ridge Mountain Men in the American Revolution
- 1978 The Politics of Prosecution: Jim Thompson, Marie Everett, Richard Nixon, and the Trial of Otto Kerner
- 1979 Of Grass and Snow: The Secret Criminal Elite
- 1987 Desert Sanctuary
- 1995 Razzle Dazzle
