= Gladstone bag =

Small portmanteau suitcase

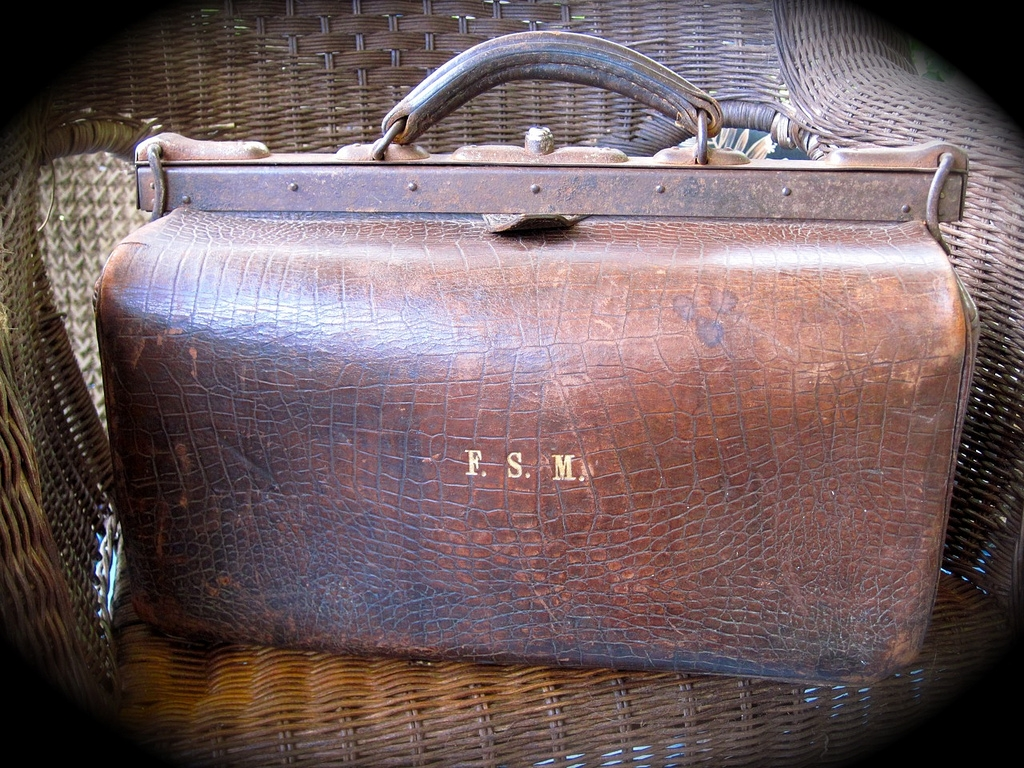
A 16-inch Gladstone bag made of ox leather

A Gladstone bag is a small portmanteau suitcase built over a rigid frame, which can separate into two equal sections. Gladstones are typically made of stiff leather and often belted with lanyards. The bags are named after William Gladstone (1809–1898), the four-time Prime Minister of the United Kingdom.

== History ==
The first Gladstone bag was designed and manufactured by J. G. Beard at his leather shop in the City of Westminster.

The patent for "An Improvement In The Frames Of Travelling Bags" was registered by Edward Cole on 4 February 1854, and sealed 14 July 1854. This original patent is still held by Cole Brothers of England in their archive. At the end of the 19th century, the business of Edward Cole was taken over and run by two of his sons, James and Edward, and subsequently changed to Cole Brothers in 1907, being located at 24a Floral Street, Covent Garden, after the earlier demolition of the Hemmings Row site in 1886 to make way for the extension to the National Gallery.

The Gladstone bag should not be confused with the attaché case-styled red box (also called a despatch box or ministerial box) which is issued to British Cabinet ministers to carry official paperwork, and the one also used to deliver government papers to the monarch. Red boxes are made by Barrow Hepburn & Gale, and the pattern of the two styles is totally different. When he was Chancellor of the Exchequer, Gladstone used a red box to carry his 1853 Budget Speech to Parliament. The travelling case to which his name is now attached was not patented until the following year. It has a frame with an opening top, rather than the book-type opening on a spine, as featured on the red box.

By the end of the 19th century, the Gladstone bag had been adopted by doctors to carry their medical equipment. Gladstone bags were also used by the pursers on the RMS Titanic to carry valuables.
