= Briefcase =

Narrow hard-sided box-shaped bag or case

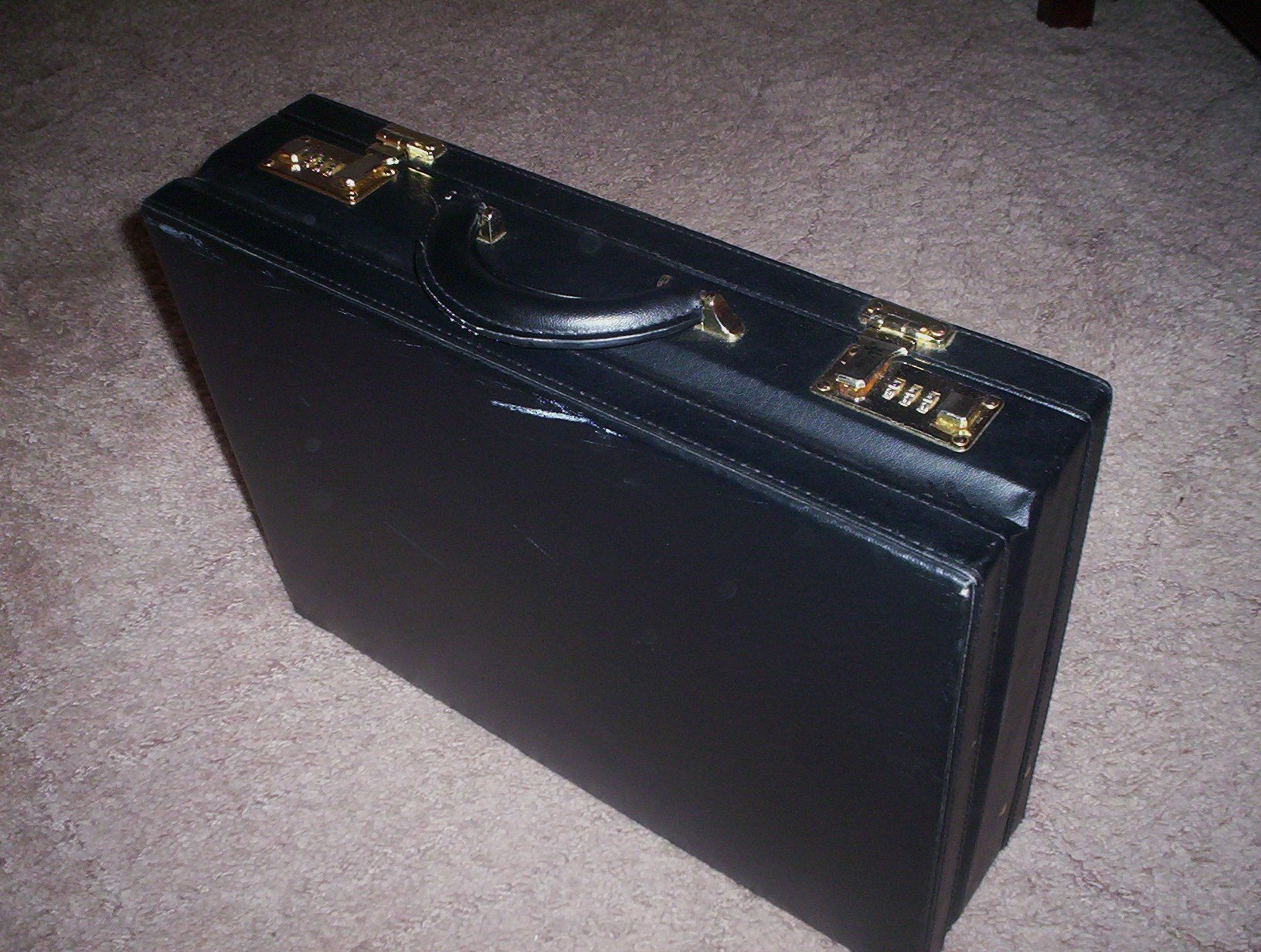
Black attaché case

A briefcase or an attaché case (/əˈtæʃeɪ/) is a narrow hard-sided box-shaped bag or case used mainly for carrying papers and equipped with a handle.

== History ==
The earliest form of a bag resembling a briefcase was the ancient Roman loculus. The loculus was a rectangular satchel used to carry a soldier's rations and belongings. By the fifteenth century, this style of satchel saw widespread use for carrying personal belongings and documents. Satchels closely resembling modern briefcases began being used by soldiers in the Napoleonic Wars. In 1860, 10 Downing Street began to use a red briefcase to hold British budgetary papers, which created an association between briefcases and economy and business. Briefcases became status symbols for those associated with white-collar professions such as business and law in the 1950s, 1960s, and 1970s.

Modern variations of the briefcase include the portfolio for loose papers, the padfolio with a writing pad, the attaché with a box-like structure, and the travel briefcase with extra compartments.

== See also ==
- Backpack
- Despatch box
- Gladstone bag
- Messenger bag
- Nuclear briefcase
- Red box (government)
- Suitcase
- Tablet case
