= Joseph L. Nellis =

American attorney (died 2004)

Joseph L. Nellis was a Washington attorney involved in various government investigations into organized crime in America.

== Biography ==
=== Early life ===
Nellis was born in Minsk, Belarus, later moving to Chicago where he grew up, his father ran the Ambassador's Hotel in the city. He attended the University of Wisconsin and Northwestern University Law School, afterwards he worked for the Office of Price Administration where he specialized in black market criminality. During World War 2 he joined the Air Force and performed cryptography work, after the war he joined the U.N. Relief and Rehabilitation Administration where he was involved in war relief efforts in Italy and Greece.

=== Kefauver committee ===
Nellis began as an assistant counsel for the Kefauver Committee, after organizing the New York hearings he was promoted to associate counsel. He headed the committee's probe into the Cleveland mafia. Along with Senator Estes Kefauver, Rudy Halley, and Dave Shivitz, Nellis visited Governor Thomas E. Dewey to question him about his pardon of Lucky Luciano in 1946 after he declined to testify about it before the committee. Dewey informed them that Luciano was pardoned owing to his help to US intelligence during Operation Underworld.

At Senator Estes Kefauver's request, he interviewed pop singer Frank Sinatra. At 4 AM on 1 March 1951, Nellis met Sinatra in an office at the top of the Rockefeller Center. Kefauver had come into possession of eight photographs of Sinatra with well-known mafia figures. One was of Sinatra with his arm around Lucky Luciano on the balcony of the Hotel Nacional in Cuba, another was of Sinatra seated with Luciano at a night club. He also appeared with the Fischetti brothers in a number of other pictures. Kefauver wanted to determine whether Sinatra should be called to testify before the committee, so he tasked Nellis with setting up an interview. Nellis contacted Sinatra's attorney Sol Gelb, through him the meeting was arranged.

Nellis quizzed Sinatra on his mafia connections. He admitted "knowing" or "seeing", and saying "hello" or "goodbye", to Lucky Luciano, the Fischetti brothers, Al Capone's cousins, Meyer Lansky, Frank Costello, Joe Adonis, Abner Zwillman, Willie Moretti, Gerardo Catena, and Bugsy Siegel. In one photograph Sinatra was seen with an attaché case departing a plane. Sinatra told Nellis that it contained razors and crayons. When Nellis suggested that there was over $100,000 in the case, Sinatra denied it, insisting that he gave no money to Luciano and that he did not know what line of business Luciano was in. He denied having any business dealings with any of the aforementioned men. At the end of the two hour meeting Nellis learnt nothing which would have enabled him to subpoena Sinatra before the official congressional hearings.

=== Post-Kefauver ===
In May 1951 he was made consultative counsel to the State Crime Commission, specifically to aid with the continuing inquiry into waterfront racketeering and gambling on Staten Island, a subject area which Nellis had investigated with the Kefauver committee but could not complete his inquiry. In April 1956 Nellis was appointed to Kefauver's presidential campaign committee, serving as special assistant to F. Joseph Donohue, committee chairman. Later Nellis served as Chief Counsel for the House Select Committee on Narcotics Control.

Nellis served as deputy director of Citizens for Humphrey-Muskie. In 1968 Sinatra embarked on a concert tour in support of Democratic Party candidate Hubert Humphrey. Nellis penned a letter to Humphrey telling him "It's true you need support from every segment of the population, but surely you would agree that you don't need support from the underworld, and Frank Sinatra is unquestionably connected with the underworld". Humphrey told Nellis that he would be careful with Sinatra, but that he could not distance himself from the singer because he was too powerful in Hollywood and the money he raised was too great. He was also general counsel for the Eleanor Roosevelt Foundation.

In 1973 he partnered with journalist Hank Messick to publish the book The Private Lives of Public Enemies. He died aged 87 from congestive heart failure at his home in Washington, DC on 10 July 2004.

== Authored works ==
=== Books ===
- (with Hank Messick) The Private Lives of Public Enemies. PH Wyden. 1973.

=== Papers ===
- "Legal Aspects of the Kefauver Investigation". The Journal of Criminal Law, Criminology, and Police Science. 42 (2): 163–170. 1951.
- "The Insanity Defense: A Crazyguilt Inheritance". Psychotherapy in Private Practice. 1 (2): 11–16. 1983.
- "Drug Smuggling: Its Legal and Therapeutic Links". Psychotherapy in Private Practice. 2 (2): 39–42. 1984.
