= Portmanteau (luggage) =

Type of leather travelling bag

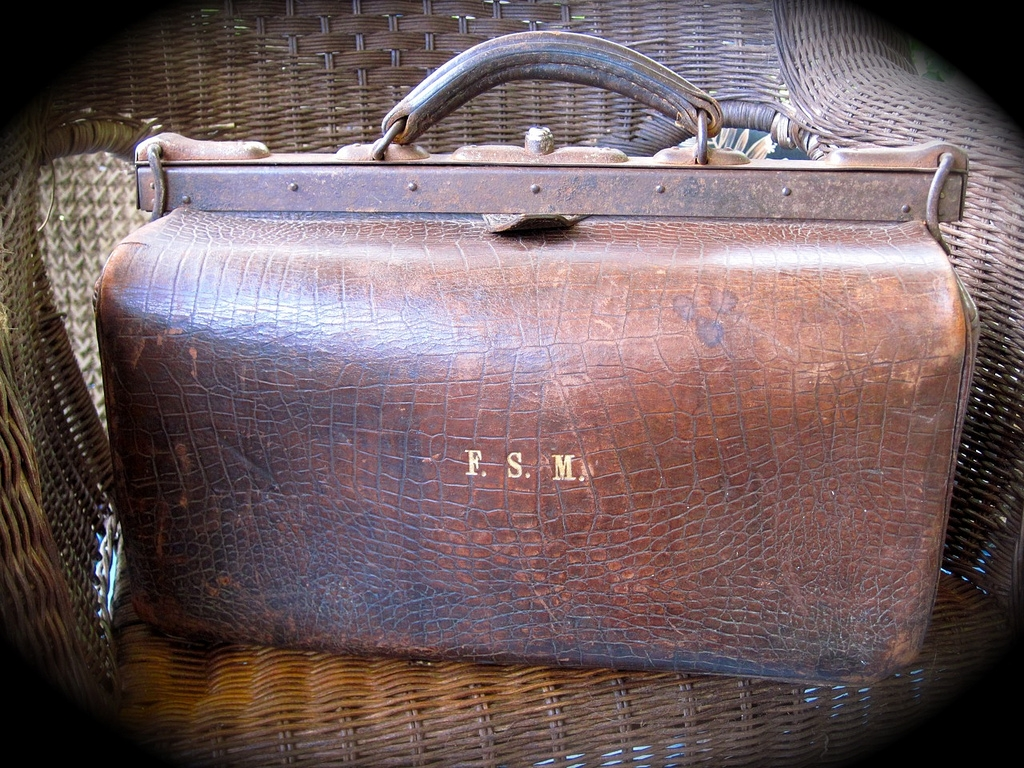
A 16-inch Gladstone bag made of ox leather

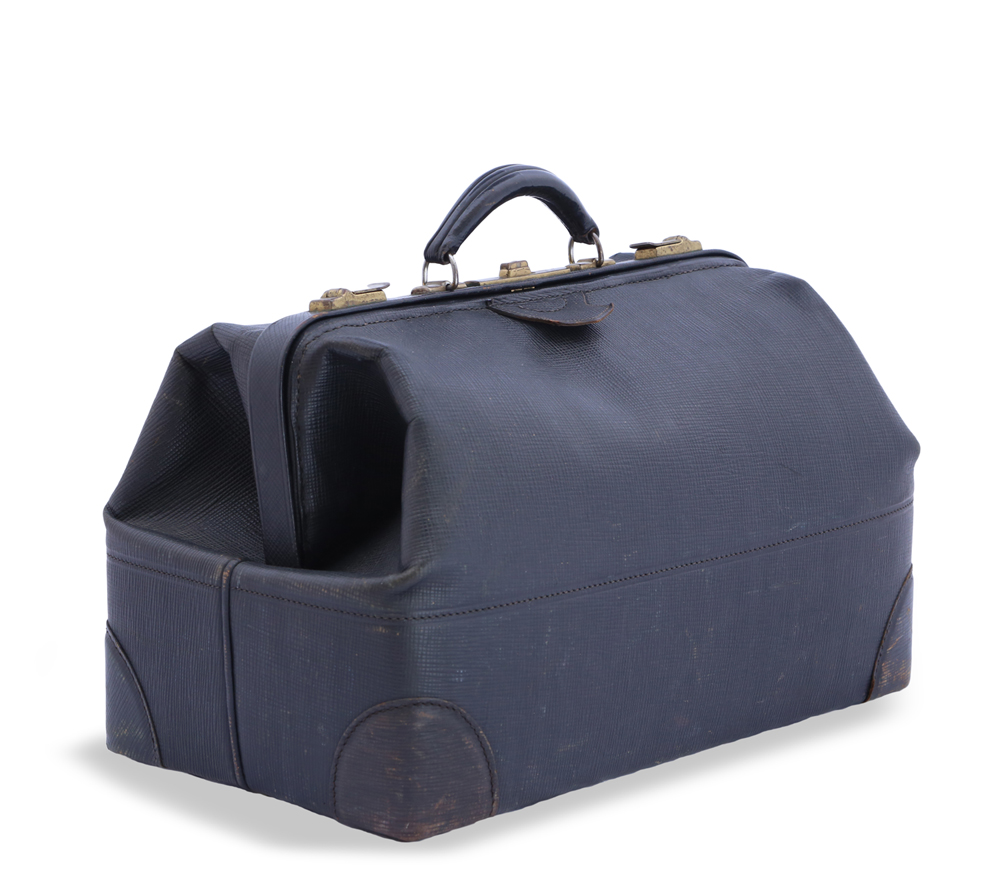
Traditional medical bag

A portmanteau is a piece of luggage, usually made of leather and opening into two equal parts. Some are large, upright, and hinged at the back and enable hanging up clothes in one half, while others are much smaller bags (such as Gladstone bags) with two equally sized compartments.

The word derives from the French word portemanteau (from porter, "to carry", and manteau, "coat") which nowadays means a coat rack but was in the past also used to refer to a traveling case or bag for clothes. By metaphorical extension, following Lewis Carroll's use of portmanteau in Through the Looking-Glass, the word now also names a type of word composed of two merged parts.

== Portmanteau mail bag ==
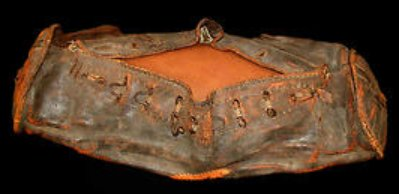
Portmanteaux used to carry letters

In the 1700s, the term also described a mail bag. This continued into the 1800s for bags used by the United States Postal Service. An 1823 resolution in Congress further stated that "locks... will be placed on the portmanteaus containing the principal mails [which] can only be opened... at the distributing offices."
