= St Mary Magdalen Bermondsey =

Coordinates: 51.4984°N 0.0810°W

St Mary Magdalen, Bermondsey
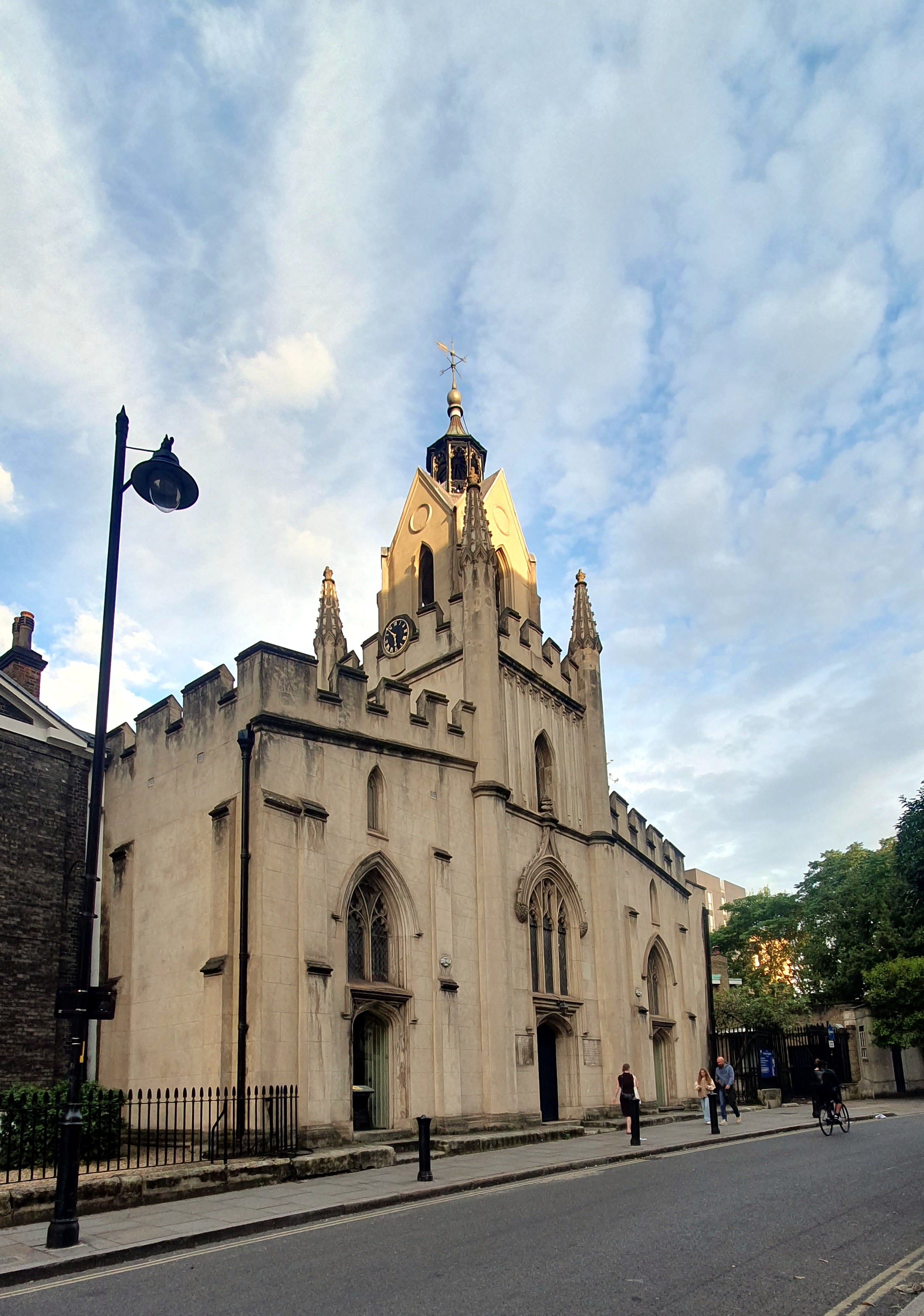
- St Mary Magdalen, Bermondsey

- Location within the Borough of Southwark
- OS grid reference: TQ 33311 79459
- Location: Bermondsey in the London Borough of Southwark
- Country: England
- Denomination: Church of England
- Website: http://www.stmarysbermondsey.org.uk/

Listed Building – Grade II*
- Reference no.: 1376567

St Mary Magdalen Bermondsey is an Anglican church dedicated to St Mary Magdalen in Bermondsey in the London Borough of Southwark. The majority of the present building is late 17th century and is Grade II* listed.

Its parish extends as far as the Thames (including the south tower of Tower Bridge, City Hall and part of London Bridge station). The parishes of St Olave Tooley Street, St Luke Grange Road and St John Horsleydown have all been merged into it.

== History ==
A church of this dedication is first recorded on this site in 1290, serving lay workers at Bermondsey Abbey. The design of that building is not known, but in 1680 the church was demolished and rebuilt, retaining the fifteenth-century late medieval tower with a gothic window and arches. This rebuilding was completed in about 1690, and was followed by the addition of a north gallery in 1705 and a south gallery in 1794. The south gallery retains its complete original boxed pews but those in the north gallery have had their gates removed. Further alterations were made under the supervision of the architect George Porter in 1830. He remodelled the tower and west end in an unacademic Gothic style and restored the medieval west window. The changes also involved removing the portico and school which extended into Bermondsey Street.

The interior was redecorated in the Gothic Revival style in 1852 and is described in a document which can be dated to 1865–1879 by reference to the then rector. In 1883 the chancel was lengthened and a new stained glass window was installed, as well as other "beautification". Surviving the Blitz, the west end interior was damaged by fire in 1971. The church was first rendered externally in 1829, and was most recently re-rendered in 1994. A detailed description is given in the volume of the Victoria County History covering the area, published in 1912. The church is now the oldest building in the locality, and the medieval arches are still visible inside the tower behind the organ (not normally accessible to the public).

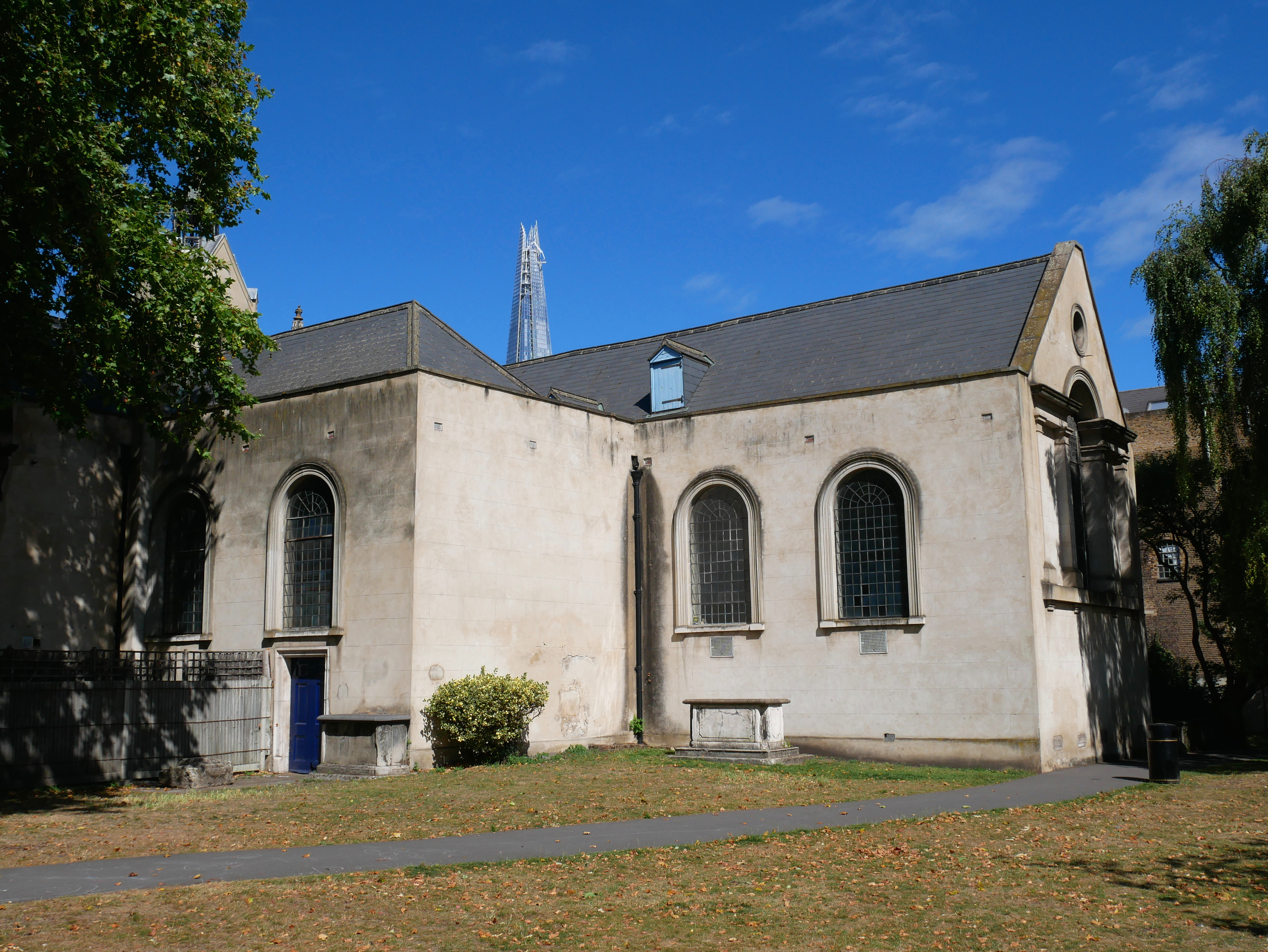
The church as seen from the southeast

The original organ was installed in 1751 and replaced by J.W. Walker in 1851; three years later, that company re-used the earlier instrument at the Church of St Peter and St Paul, Heytesbury, Wiltshire.

Visible in the church are two fine carved stone capitals of medieval date, which were discovered locally in the early 20th century and passed to the church for safe-keeping. They are almost certainly parts of the structure of Bermondsey Abbey. The church also owns an item of medieval silver plate, called the Bermondsey Mazer, which is held in the care of the Victoria and Albert Museum, and is said to be the only surviving silver from the Abbey.

The Parish Clerks has three qualifying clerks from the three merged parishes, but none have been appointed by the incumbent for many years. It is the guild church of the Bermondsey Tanners Company.

The churchyard was closed for burials in 1854, in common with other London churchyards, being overcrowded and a thus health hazard. It contains a number of listed monuments, mostly tombs, notably that of the ancestors of Charles Rolls, aviation pioneer and co-founder of Rolls-Royce. It is now in the care of Southwark Council, title having been passed to the Vestry of Bermondsey in 1882. All the older church registers are held by the London Metropolitan Archives.

An inventory of the church ornaments and vestments was made in 1553, including "a painted cloth to hang before the Rood in Lent." A record was made of items sold during the Reformation, including "an old cope of red silk with roses of silver and gilt", the painting of Biblical verses in the church, and the renewal of the timber porch.

== Sources ==
- Philips, G.W. (1841). The History and Antiquities of the Parish of Bermondsey. London: J. Unwin.
