= Burt Goldblatt =

American illustrator

Burt Goldblatt (né Burton George Goldblatt; 11 December 1924, in Dorchester, Massachusetts – 30 August 2006, in Boston) was an American art director, graphic designer, photographer, and author. He was best known for designing the covers of jazz albums.

== Biography ==
Goldblatt fought in the Pacific theater as a member of the United States Army during World War II. After the war he attended the Massachusetts College of Art, and took a job in a print factory while doing contract work as an artist in Boston. In the early 1950s, he relocated to New York City, and in 1953 took a position with CBS, where he worked until 1955 doing advertising and design of show credits.

During this time, as the long playing record became commercially viable, he began designing album covers for both major and independent labels, including Decca, Atlantic, Savoy, Roost, and Bethlehem, as well as the bootleg label Jolly Roger. Among those he designed covers for were Chris Connor, Duke Ellington, Billie Holiday, Herbie Mann, Carmen McRae, Charles Mingus, Oscar Pettiford, Eddie Shu, and Kai Winding. While best-known for designing jazz covers, especially in the 1950s and 1960s, he also did some work for gospel, pop, and rock albums.

Goldblatt regularly visited jazz clubs and studio recording sessions to photograph, some of which were incorporated into his album covers. He was well known by jazz musicians; Bud Powell wrote a song titled "Burt Covers Bud" in tribute to Goldblatt. The New York Times wrote that his style "encompassed black-and-white portraits and studio photographs, inspired by film noir, as well as gritty street scenes, often abstractly overlaid with flat colors, evoking a sense of urban night life. Expressionistic line drawings of performers in action were also in vogue."

Later in his career, he concentrated on work as an author, writing or co-writing books on film, music, sports, and true crime. He died of congestive heart failure at age 82.

== Bibliography ==
- Theodore O. Cron, Burt Goldblatt: Portrait of Carnegie Hall: A Nostalgic Portrait in Pictures. 1966
- Paul D. Zimmerman, Burt Goldblatt: The Marx Brothers at the Movies. New York, Putnam's 1968
- Robert Shelton and Burt Goldblatt: Country Music Story: A Picture History of Country and Western Music. New Rochelle, Arlington House 1971
- Burt Goldblatt and Chris Steinbrunner: Cinema of the Fantastic. New York, Galahad Books 1972
- Hank Messick and Burt Goldblatt: The Mobs and the Mafia. The illustrated History of Organized Crime. New York, Th. Y. Crowell 1972
- Hank Messick and Burt Goldblatt: Kidnapping: The Illustrated History. 1974
- John Devaney and Burt Goldblatt: The Stanley Cup – A Complete Pictorial History.. Rand McNally & Company. Chicago, 1975
- Martin Appel and Burt Goldblatt: Baseball's Best: The Hall of Fame Gallery. New York, McGraw-Hill, 1977
- Burt Goldblatt: The Newport Jazz Festival: The Illustrated History. New York, Dial Press, 1977
- John Devaney and Burt Goldblatt with Barbara Devaney: The World Series: A Complete Pictorial History. Chicago, Rand McNally, 1981
