= Joseph Linsey =

American mobster (1899–1994)

Joseph Maurice Linsey (born Linsky; May 27, 1899 – November 24, 1994) was an American bootlegger in Boston during the Prohibition era associated with Joseph Kennedy and Meyer Lansky. He later became a prominent businessman and philanthropist, specifically making contributions to Brandeis University. In 1960, he was the national chairman of the Brandeis Athletic Associations.

== Biography ==
Linsey was born in Grodno, Russian Empire (now Belarus) to Jewish parents Abraham Linsky and Sarah Slotnick and immigrated with his family to Boston at age 1. After his father died of tuberculosis in 1908, his mother remarried grocer Joseph Ackner. He went to work at the age of 9 delivering groceries and later became apprenticed as a meatcutter. He became a U.S. citizen at age 19 and adopted the name Linsey.

At the start of Prohibition, the 21-year-old Linsey began bootlegging illegal liquor with Charles "King" Solomon from a front business, the National Realty Company. He also bought Canadian liquor from the Bronfmans and, although serving a year for violations of the Volstead Act, he was acquitted from his two later indictments on similar charges. He was alleged by Vinnie Teresa to have been involved in wholesale gambling in the time after the Prohibition era.

He married model Thelma Ray in 1969. He died of heart failure at Boston's Faulkner Hospital in 1994, aged 95.
