= Barrow Hepburn & Gale =

British luxury leather goods manufacturer

- Founded: 1760; 266 years ago
- Founder: John Hepburn
- Headquarters: Bermondsey, London, England

Barrow Hepburn & Gale is a British luxury leather goods manufacturer best known as the producer of the despatch boxes used by the Government of the United Kingdom. It was founded in 1760 as Hepburn and Sons. The company also makes Royal Maundy purses, for which it was granted a royal warrant in 1968.

Barrow Hepburn & Gale despatch boxes have become a symbol of the British democratic system and its constitutional monarchy, being used by successive sovereigns and prime ministers. As a company, Barrow Hepburn & Gale claim they have an unbroken chain of makers whose skills have been passed from one master craftsman to apprentice since 1760. They continue to work closely with the Royal Household, the British Government, and private clients.

== History ==
=== Foundation and early history (1760–1901) ===
Barrow Hepburn & Gale was founded in 1760 under the name of Hepburn and Sons by John Hepburn, after having moved to Bermondsey from Chesham and there opened a tannery. There are records of the Hepburn family working from Long Lane in Bermondsey throughout the 19th century, eventually coming work with the Gales in both Deptford and Bermondsey. Samuel Barrow, originally working as a tanner himself, from 1848 set up his own company, Samuel Barrow and Brother, based in the Grange. In 1901 there was the merger of Hepburn and Gale with Ross and Co., another leather company from the 17th century, which possessed the rights to manufacture ministerial boxes for the government. Over time, the company became a larger supplier to the British Army – for items such as saddles and bayonet scabbards – especially during WW1, but also in the Boer and Crimean Wars.

=== Expansion in the early 20th century ===
Through a series of mergers, Barrow Hepburn and Gale came to be "the largest leather concern in Bermondsey in the 20th century", with Hepburn and Gale merging with Ross and Co. in 1901. Ross and Co., another tanning company dating to the 18th century, possessed rights to manufacture ministerial boxes for the government – the famous dispatch boxes with which Barrow Hepburn and Gale would come to be associated.

In 1920, Hepburn, Gale, and Ross merged again with Samuel Barrow and Brother, by this time having become a very successful company, manufacturing a broader range of leather goods and expanding its operations to encompass the production of glue, gelatine and rubber. A number of other mergers followed, such as to Blackman's Leather Goods Company, which supplied baby harnesses to the Duchess of Kent and to Princess Juliana of the Netherlands, resulting in an ever growing company. Eventually, with the acquisition of Thomas Holmes and Son in 1935, it achieved the position of producing a twelfth of the total sole leather of the country.

=== During and after World War II ===
In the Second World War, the company aided the British war effort as it had done in the First World War, producing leather goods for the government. The tanneries at the Grange in Bermondsey were destroyed during the Blitz. George Odey, the director of Barrow Hepburn and Gale since 1933, would be appointed a CBE for his company's contributions.

In 1967, there was a collapse in the world leather market, due in part to the demand for material caused by the Vietnam war. Price of "notes on the accounts [...] show that for the same amount of leather production the hide cost rose from approximately from £2.9m in 1964 to £3.3m in 1965 and finally to £4.2m in 1966". However, Barrow Hepburn and Gale remained successful despite the slump in the 1960s, seeing a turnover of £22.5 million in 1967, a year that saw a crash in the UK leather industry. The chairman, Richard Odey, took the opportunity to expand and sought to buy up as great a share of the shrinking market as possible.

== Bermondsey tanners ==
Barrow Hepburn & Gale's roots are in Bermondsey, a historic leather district, known for its tanneries already in the 17th century. The necessity of a guild, the Comonalty of the Mistery of Tanners of St Mary Magdalen Bermondsey of Surrey, which was given royal charter by Queen Anne in 1703, attests to the history of tanning in Bermondsey. Barrow Hepburn & Gale first occupied three tanneries in Long Lane that had been in existence since the middle of the 17th century, purchased by John Hepburn. This site, known as the Grange, comprised two and a half acres by the time of the Topographical History of Surrey published in 1841 by Edward Brayley. In 1898, the Grange tannery site burned down, after which it was restored in its current state, now converted flats at Tanners Yard.

== Despatch boxes ==
The company is responsible for producing despatch boxes for the UK government, a tradition dating back to Prince Albert. The form of the boxes, with red-stained British leather and gold print, has remained largely unchanged since the 19th century, since Gladstone used such a box for his budget in 1853. They have continued to be used by all subsequent chancellors, including George Ward Hunt who supposedly found his despatch box empty, having left his budget speech at home. Since then, a tradition has arisen of the chancellor raising the box up outside 11 Downing Street to prove he has the box and therefore a budget for the country.

The form of the boxes has since been standardised, with each ministerial box bearing its owner's and recipient's names. The modern despatch boxes also have handles on the bottom of the box so that it must be locked properly to be transported, otherwise its contents would fall out.

Barrow Hepburn & Gale continues to supply the Royal Household and the UK government with the original design and specification.

== Maundy money purses ==
Royal Maundy in England dates back to the 12th century, with the first distribution known from records being that of King John at Knaresborough, North Yorkshire, in 1210. The gifts changed over time from clothing and other such alms for the poor to silver coinage presented in a leather purse. Each recipient at the service is given a white purse with green strings and a red purse with white strings with legal tender in place of the clothing allowance, and a white purse with red strings containing the Maundy money, numbered coins equal to the monarch's current age. The purses are produced by Barrow Hepburn & Gale using red-stained British ram's leather.
