= Royal Maundy =

Religious service held on Maundy Thursday

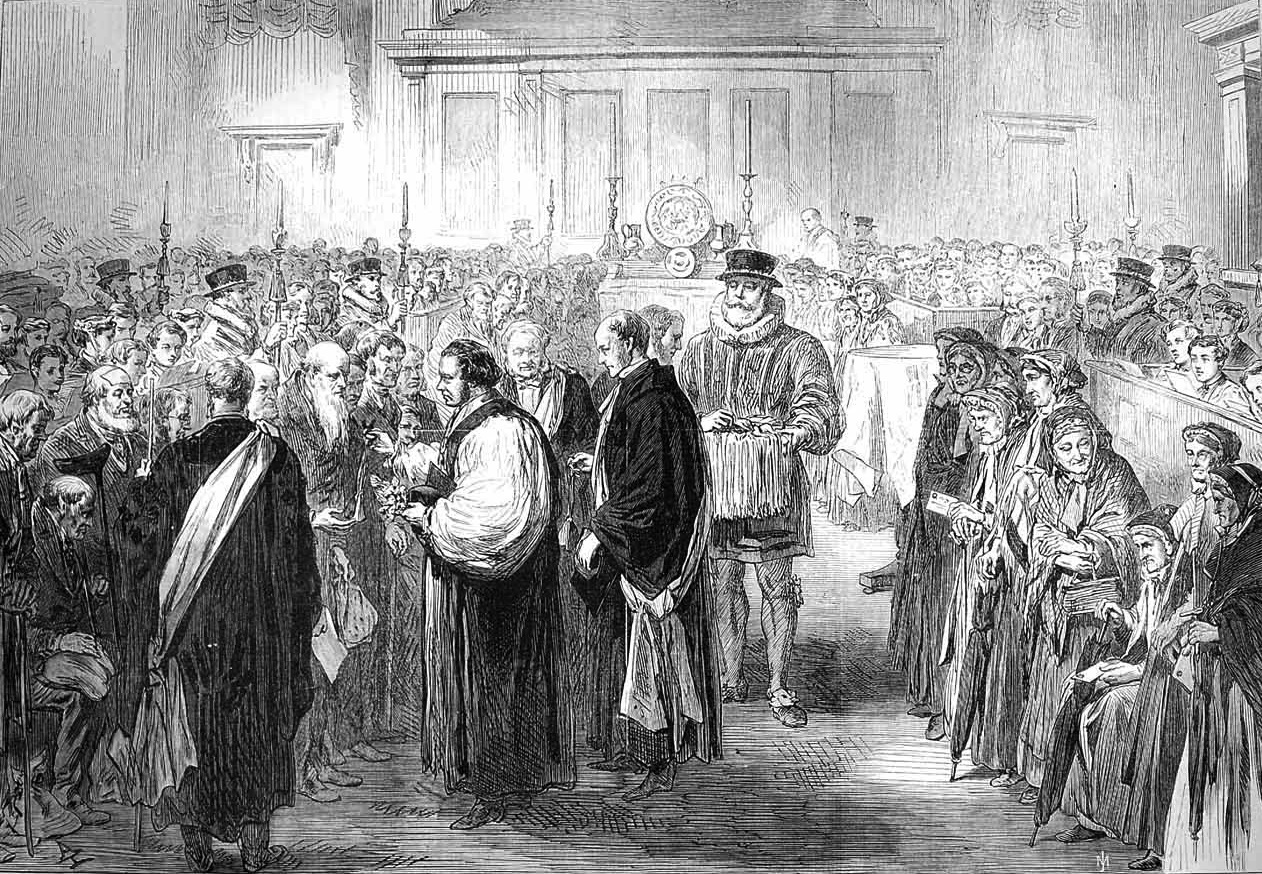
A Royal Maundy ceremony in 1867

Royal Maundy (/ˈmɔːndi/) is a religious service in the Church of England held on Maundy Thursday, the day before Good Friday. At the service, the British monarch or a royal official ceremonially distributes small silver coins known as "Maundy money" (legally, "the King's Maundy money") as symbolic alms to elderly recipients. The coins are technically legal tender, but typically do not circulate due to their silver content and numismatic value. A small sum of ordinary money is also given in lieu of gifts of clothing and food that the sovereign once bestowed on Maundy recipients.

The name "Maundy" and the ceremony itself derive from an instruction, or mandatum, of Jesus Christ at the Last Supper that his followers should love one another. In the Middle Ages, English monarchs washed the feet of beggars in imitation of Jesus, and presented gifts and money to the poor. Over time, additional money was substituted for the clothing and other items that had once been distributed. Beginning in 1699 the monarch did not attend the service, sending an official in his place. The custom of royal representatives washing the feet of beggars did not survive the 18th century.

In 1931 Princess Marie Louise attended Royal Maundy, and afterwards suggested that her cousin, King George V, make the distributions the following year. He did so, beginning a new royal custom. Traditionally, the service was held in or near London, in most years in the early-to-mid-20th century at Westminster Abbey; the service is now held in a different church (usually a cathedral) every year. Queen Elizabeth II almost always attended, being absent only five times in her long reign. Recipients were once chosen for their poverty and were entitled to remain as Maundy recipients for life; today new recipients are chosen every year for service to their churches or communities, on the recommendation of clergy of various Christian denominations. Generally, recipients live in the diocese where the service is held, although this was altered for the 2011 and 2012 services. The 2020 and 2021 services were cancelled due to the COVID-19 pandemic, with recipients sent their gifts by post. At the 2024 service, Queen Camilla attended in place of her husband, King Charles III, following his diagnosis with cancer.

Maundy money is struck in denominations of one penny, two pence, three pence, and four pence. Until the 18th century the coins given were from the circulating coinage, and it was not until the latter half of the century that the four Maundy coins developed as distinct, noncirculating pieces. The obverse design of the coins features the reigning monarch. The reverse, with a crowned numeral enclosed by a wreath, derives from a design first used during the reign of King William III and Queen Mary II, and which has been virtually unaltered since 1822. The coins are presented in two leather purses, a white one containing coins to the value of the same number of pence as the years of the monarch's age, and a red purse containing a £5 and a 50p coin. In most years there are fewer than 2,000 complete sets of Maundy money; they are highly sought after by collectors.

== Origins, early and medieval history ==
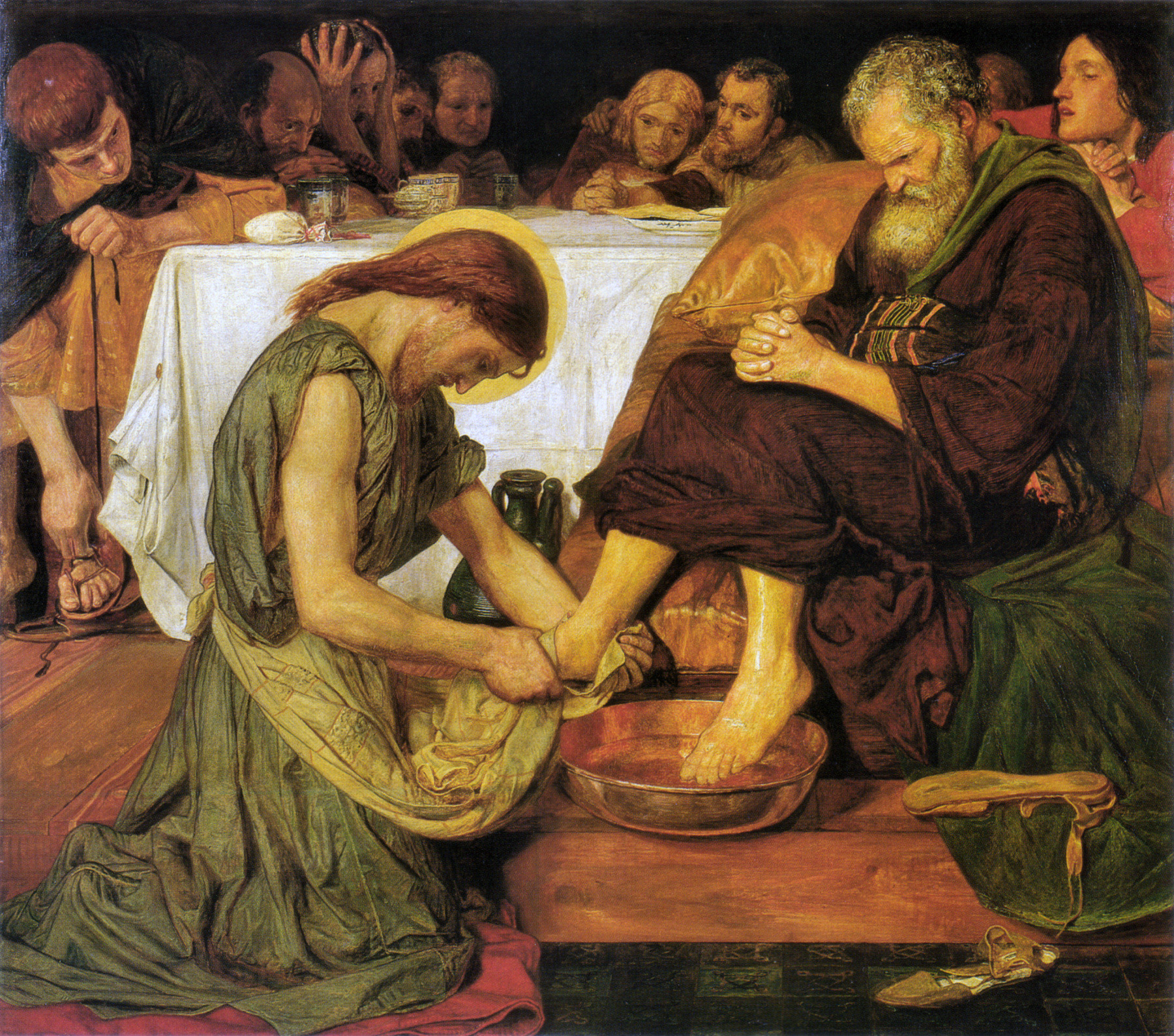
Jesus Washing Peter's Feet by Ford Madox Brown

The word Maundy derives from the command or mandatum by Christ at the Last Supper, to love one another. The Gospels relate that on the eve of his Crucifixion, Jesus Christ ate a meal with his disciples. After the meal, it is recorded that Jesus washed their feet, and gave them the following mandatum or command: "If I then, your Lord and Master, have washed your feet, ye also ought to wash one another's feet. For I have given you an example, that ye should do as I have done unto you." The Latin Mandatum is the derivation of the word Maundy, and the Royal Maundy service evolved from Jesus' command to his disciples.

By the fourth or fifth century a ceremony had been developed following Holy Communion on Maundy Thursday, in which prominent church leaders washed the feet of the poor. The ceremony, known as the pedilavium, was performed daily in some monasteries; in 992, Bishop Oswald of Worcester died during its performance.

The first English monarch to be recorded as distributing alms at a Maundy service was John, who on 15 April 1210 donated garments, forks, food, and other gifts to the poor of Knaresborough, Yorkshire. John is also the first English monarch to be recorded as giving gifts of small silver coins to the poor when in 1213 he gave 13 pence to each of 13 poor men at a ceremony in Rochester—the number being symbolic of the Twelve Apostles together with either Jesus or an angel. Few details of the 13th century Maundy survive; they are known to have existed from records which show the spending necessary for the gifts to the poor. The monarch was not alone in performing the rituals of the Maundy service; Henry III's children assisted him as part of their political and religious training. Henry's son, Edward I, was the first monarch to keep the Maundy only on or about Maundy Thursday; before Edward, additional Maundys might be kept during the year. According to Virginia Cole in her study of royal children's role in the 13th century Maundy, the service had a political purpose as well, as needing to humble himself by doing the pedilavium proclaimed the monarch's greatness. Attendance at a Maundy service became an obligation for all major European ruling houses.

By 1363 the English monarch performed the pedilavium and also gave gifts: that year, fifty-year-old Edward III gave fifty pence to each of fifty poor men. It is not known, however, whether it was as yet the practice each year to have the number of pence and the number of recipients track the monarch's age: Henry IV was the first monarch to decree that the number of pence given be determined by the monarch's age. The ceremony was not always performed on Maundy Thursday; it could be postponed a day to Good Friday by royal command, as it was in 1510. Nobles could hold their own Maundy distributions, as did Henry Percy, 5th Earl of Northumberland in the early 16th century, according to a contemporary record: "My Lord useth and accustomyth yerly uppon the said Maundy Thursday when his Lordshipe is at home to gyf yerly as manny Pursses of Lether ... with as manny Penys in every purse to as many poore men as his Lordshipe is Yeres of Aige and one for the Yere of my Lords Aige to come."

Although Mary I and Elizabeth I differed religiously, both performed elaborate Maundy ceremonies. Records from 1556 show that Mary washed the feet of forty-one poor women (reflecting her age) while "ever on her knees", and gave them forty-one pence each, as well as gifts of bread, fish, and clothing, donating her own gown to the woman said to be poorest of all. In 1572, disliking the scenes as each woman tried to secure a piece of the royal gown, Elizabeth granted a sum of £1 to each recipient in lieu of the gown, giving it in a red purse. Contemporary writer William Lambarde noted that the money was substituted for the gown "to avoid trouble of suite, which accustomabile was made for that perferment". In years in which plague was rife, the monarch did not attend, sending an official, usually the Lord High Almoner, to make the distributions and perform the pedilavium. Even though scented water was used to disguise any unpleasant odours from the poor, the feet were washed three times before the monarch performed the pedilavium, once by a menial and twice by court officials. In later years, sweet-smelling nosegays were used to disguise odours—the nosegays are still carried today.

== Post-Restoration ==
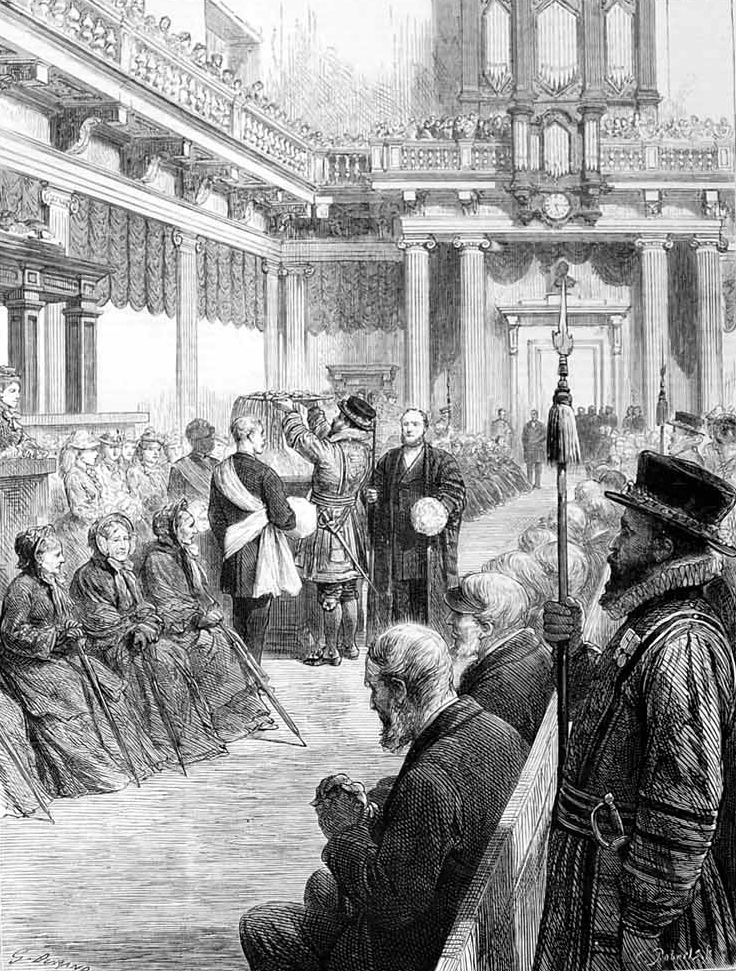
A Royal Maundy ceremony in 1877

Charles I rarely attended the Royal Maundy service. Author Brian Robinson, who traced the development of Royal Maundy, suggests that after the 1660 Stuart Restoration, his son Charles II attempted to gain popularity by assiduous attendance (and distribution of money) at the service. Charles II even attended during the plague years of 1661 and 1663. His brother and successor, James II, performed the ceremony as well. Although there is a record of William III doing so in 1698, most sources state that James was the last to wash the feet of the poor himself, in 1685. There is no record of any attendance by a monarch at the Royal Maundy ceremony after 1698 until 1932, but pre-1725 records are vague. The Lord High Almoner continued to perform the pedilavium at the Maundy ceremony until 1737. Today, the only traces of the pedilavium at Royal Maundy are the nosegays and the linen towels worn or carried by several of the officials.

The service was usually held somewhere near London. This was done to suit the monarch's convenience: in medieval times, it was held in Windsor, Eton, Richmond, Greenwich, or wherever the monarch happened to be at Eastertime. In 1714, with the monarch no longer present at the ceremony, the service was moved to the Chapel Royal, Whitehall, where it remained until 1890, when the Royal Chapel was given to the Royal United Services Institute. After 1890, by order of Queen Victoria, it was moved to Westminster Abbey, though in years when there was a coronation and the abbey was closed for preparations, the service was held at St Paul's Cathedral. From 1954 to 1970, it was held in even-numbered years at Westminster, and in odd-numbered years at provincial cathedrals; since then it has, in most years, been held outside London. When the service was confined to London, recipients were customarily householders who had met their financial obligations to society, but had since fallen on hard times.

The number of recipients continued to track the monarch's age. Until the joint reign of William III and Mary II, the recipients were of the same sex as the monarch. During that reign, each of the monarchs made gifts to poor people of their sex, but after Mary's death, only men received gifts from William. Beginning with the reign of George I (1714–1727), both men and women have received gifts, each sex in a number corresponding to the monarch's age, each recipient receiving that number of pence. Despite the monarch's absence, the ceremony was held each year, with the Lord High Almoner or the Sub-Almoner deputising for the sovereign.

The gift of clothing was eliminated for women beginning in 1724, as the recipients immediately tried on the gifts and exchanged ill-fitting ones with each other, a practice thought unseemly in a church. The women were instead given 35 shillings (decimalised as £1.75). For men, the clothing gift was replaced by woollen cloth that year. Men continued to be given cloth until 1883, when royal officials realised that many of the recipients were too poor to have the cloth made into garments and were instead selling it. Men were given 45 shillings (decimalised as £2.25) in lieu of the cloth, an amount increased in 1973 to £3 for both men and women.

There is a record of the 1802 Royal Maundy; it notes that the recipients were given 4 pounds (1.8 kg) of beef and four threepenny loaves. After the 1837 Maundy, William IV ordered that as the recipients were selling the food gift for less than its full value—they were to be given 30 shillings in food which was sometimes sold by the recipients for as little as five shillings—it was to be replaced by a money gift of 30 shillings. This amount (decimalised into £1.50) is still given. The same year, a report on the Civil List written for the House of Commons proposed eliminating the Royal Maundy: "Considering that the sum distributed annually as alms and charity is applied in a manner suited rather to ancient than modern times and is attended with some expense, it may not be inexpedient to consider whether the purpose of the Royal benevolence might not be more fully attained if some other and better mode of distribution were adopted." William IV's death aged 71 that year and the accession of his 18-year-old niece Queen Victoria resulted in a dramatic drop in the number of Maundy recipients. As at that time a Maundy recipient continued in that status for life, the surplus recipients were placed on waiting lists, and given royal charity through other means. One vacancy occurred a week before the 1838 Maundy when recipient Elizabeth Love died aged 110.

In 1843, The Illustrated London News described a Maundy ceremony:

On the day alluded to a certain number of poor men and women, of each the exact number of our sovereign's age, attends divine worship in the Royal Chapel, Whitehall in the morning and afternoon. Bread, meat and fish is distributed to them in large wooden bowls, and a procession formed of the royal almoner or sub-almoner, with other officers, who are decorated with white scarfs and sashes, and each carrying a bouquet of flowers; one of the officers supports a large gold dish or salver, on which are placed small red and white leather bags, the red containing a sovereign, the white the pieces ... termed Maundy Money. One of each of these bags is given to the persons selected to receive the royal bounty; they have likewise given to them cloth, linen, shoes &c., as well as a small maple cup, out of which previous to the termination of the ceremony they drink the Queen's health ... These small pieces are, by an order of Government declared current coins of the realm, therefore no one dare refuse to take them if offered in payment, still they are not in reality intended for that purpose.

The drinking of the monarch's health, which is believed to have originated with the custom of the loving cup, was abolished in the 19th century, though the exact date is uncertain. In the early 20th century, members of the royal family sometimes attended the Royal Maundy service—Queen Alexandra twice was present. Most Royal Maundy ceremonies in the first part of the century were attended by Princess Helena or by her daughter Princess Marie Louise. In 1931, Marie Louise was present at Royal Maundy and suggested, after the service, that her cousin King George V make the distributions the following year. King George did so in 1932, the only time he was at the service during his reign. In 1936, the year of King George's death, the new king Edward VIII made the distribution. George VI, who succeeded in 1936, did not attend until 1940, and then not again until 1944, his place being taken in most years by the Lord High Almoner, Cosmo Gordon Lang, Archbishop of Canterbury.

Until 1956 a recipient, once chosen for the Maundy service, had the right to continue to be a recipient for life. In 1957, with the service leaving London for the first time in over two centuries (it was held in 1957 at St Albans), this became impractical and it was decided that, in future years, recipients would attend once only. To honour the promise to the surviving lifetime appointees, they were given the opportunity to attend whenever the service was held in London, and were sent an equivalent sum by post in years when it was not.

== Modern day ==
=== Queen Elizabeth II's reign ===
Queen Elizabeth II, who first attended Royal Maundy as Princess Elizabeth of York in 1935, was absent from the service only five times during her long reign. She was absent twice following childbirth, and twice because she was visiting other parts of the Commonwealth, and, at age 95, did not attend the 2022 service at St George's Chapel in Windsor, with Charles, Prince of Wales and Camilla, Duchess of Cornwall standing in her place.

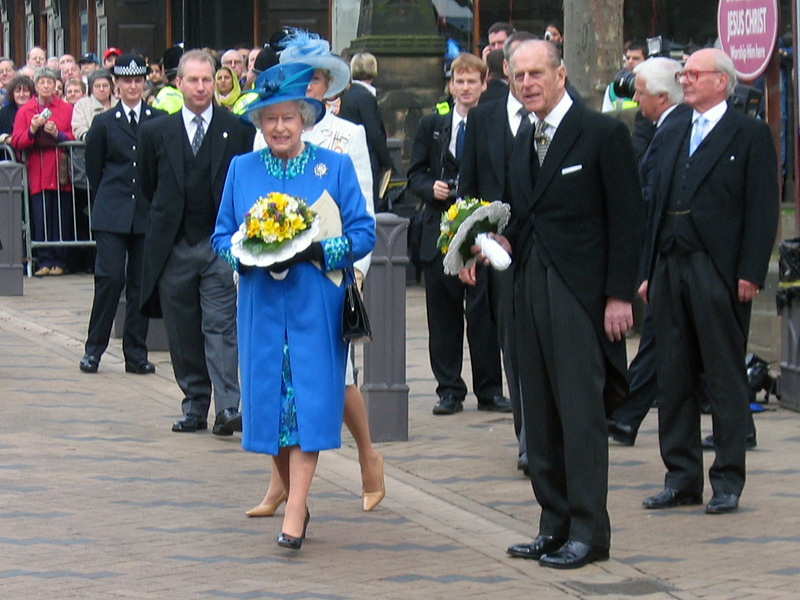
Queen Elizabeth II (centre, in blue) and Prince Philip hold nosegays as they leave Wakefield Cathedral in West Yorkshire after the 2005 Royal Maundy

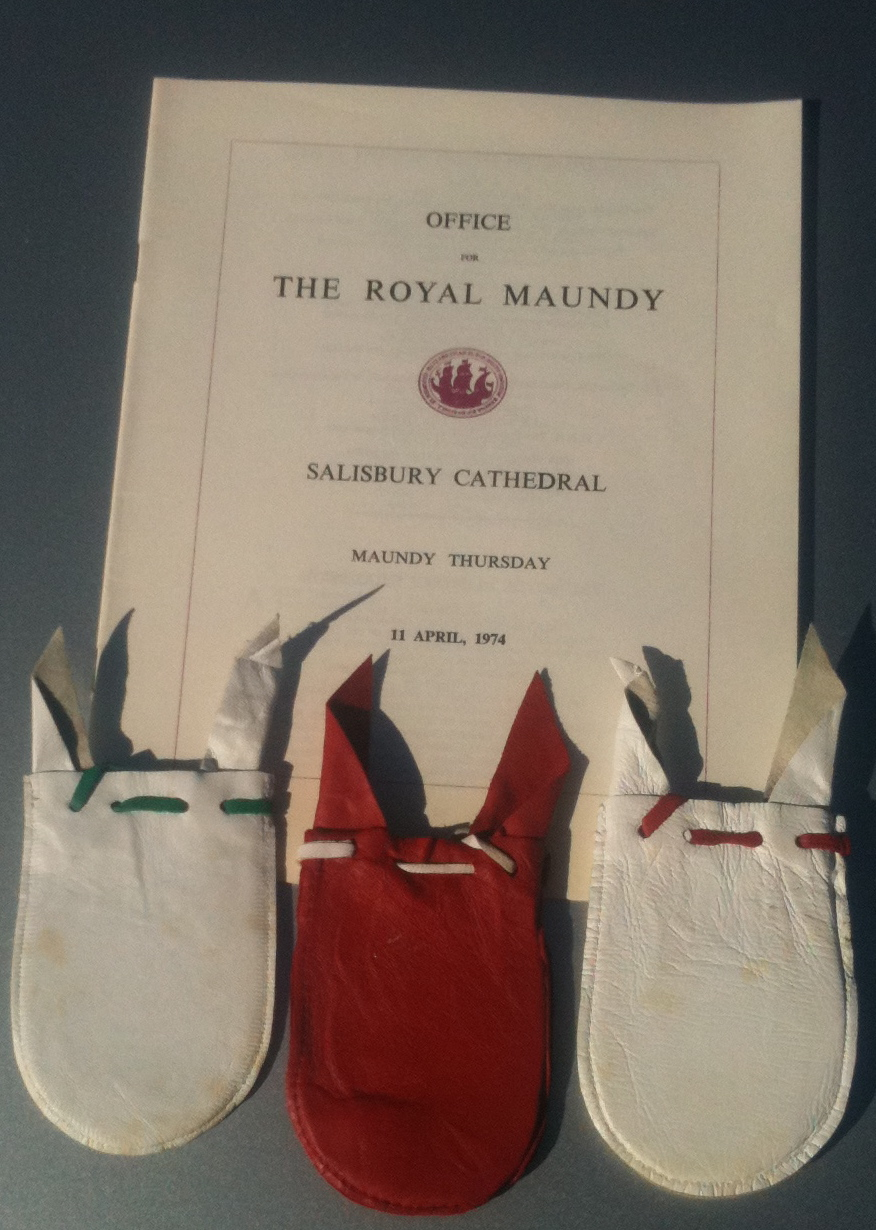
An order of service and set of Maundy purses as given to a male recipient for the 1974 Maundy at Salisbury Cathedral. All male participants from 1936 to 1979 received (from left) a white purse with green strings in the first distribution, containing the clothing allowance, and in the second distribution a red purse with white strings containing the allowances in lieu of provisions and the monarch's gown, and a white purse with red strings containing the Maundy money.

Elizabeth II viewed the service as an important part of her devotional life. It was the only occasion on which she visited others to make awards, as recipients of honours usually came to her. According to Ronald Allison and Sarah Riddell in their Royal Encyclopedia, the service "has become the occasion of a royal pilgrimage to different parts of the country". Elizabeth directed that the service not be held in London more often than once in ten years. Westminster Abbey was the site of the 2001 Royal Maundy, and again in 2011. The 2011 service was billed as the first ever televised, but in fact the 1979, 1982 and 1986 services were televised on BBC1.

The ceremony has only been held outside England twice: in 1982, at St Davids Cathedral in Wales, and 2008, at St Patrick's Cathedral in Northern Ireland. With the 2017 service at Leicester Cathedral, every Anglican cathedral in England has hosted the Royal Maundy, and all did so with Elizabeth in attendance.

The 2020 and 2021 services were cancelled due to the COVID-19 pandemic; the gifts to the chosen recipients were sent by post, after the coins were blessed at the Chapel Royal.

=== King Charles III's reign ===
Charles III's first Maundy service as king took place at York Minster on 6 April 2023, accompanied by Queen Camilla. After the announcement in February 2024 that the King was stepping back from royal duties following a diagnosis of cancer, Queen Camilla deputised for her husband at the 2024 service at Worcester Cathedral, with the King sending an audio message to the Maundy recipients expressing his "great sadness" at his absence.

Venues under Charles III:

- 2023: York Minster
- 2024: Worcester Cathedral (represented by Queen Camilla)
- 2025: Durham Cathedral
- 2026: St Asaph Cathedral

=== Recipients and ceremony ===
The recipients are pensioners, chosen on an interdenominational basis from various Christian churches for their service to their churches and communities. In most years, recipients are nominated by Christian clergy of various denominations in the diocese where the service is held. In 2011, however, as well as recipients representing Westminster Abbey, forty recipients came from the Anglican Diocese of Gibraltar in Europe, which covers continental Europe, and forty from the Diocese of Sodor and Man, which consists of the Isle of Man. Robert Patterson, Bishop of Sodor and Man, while at a conference of Anglican bishops, had invited Elizabeth to his cathedral for Maundy services; he received word that this would be too difficult, but that his diocese could nominate recipients. For 2012, in honour of her Diamond Jubilee, recipients were selected from all 44 dioceses in the United Kingdom for the service at York Minster.

The Yeomen of the Guard are present at the ceremony and serve as "Indoor Guard"; the choir of the Chapel Royal is also present. Six wandsmen, whose original function is uncertain, guide the recipients to their places and render any other help which is needed. Present at the ceremony are four Maundy Children (formally "Children of the Royal Almonry"), two boys and two girls. The original Maundy Children were four old men, charity recipients, whose sole duty was to attend at the Royal Maundy service wearing linen scarves. As their fees for the service amounted to over twenty pounds per year, this was deemed an abuse of charity, and in 1808 the old men were pensioned off and replaced by actual children. The first children appointed from 1808 did not personally attend the service, but their parents received five guineas per year to aid in their education until the age of fourteen, and four other children from schools in the City of Westminster represented them at the service. Today, the Maundy Children are chosen from religious and state schools, and receive a set of Maundy coins for their participation. Officials in the Maundy service wear towels over their clothing, worn over the shoulder and tied at the waist. The linen towels were once retained by their wearers, but since 1883, the same towels, laundered each year, have been used.

In 1968, a royal warrant was granted to Barrow Hepburn and Gale to produce the traditional white and red leather purses, which continues to today. Until 1979, Queen Elizabeth II made two distributions of money in leather purses to each recipient. The first distribution, given to women in green purses and to men in white, was of an allowance in lieu of the clothing formerly given. The white purses used for the clothing allowance may be distinguished from the white purses which contained Maundy money, as the former was tied with a short green string; the latter bears a long red string. The clothing allowance purses had been introduced in 1936; prior to that, the clothing allowance was distributed in a paper packet. In the second distribution two purses were given by the monarch; the red one contained £1.50 for provisions, once given in kind, and the additional sum of £1 mandated by Elizabeth I. The white purses contained the Maundy money. After 1979, the separate distribution of the clothing allowance was discontinued—the gifts have now been consolidated, and recipients thereafter received two purses in a single distribution, one white containing the Maundy coins, and one red containing the other money. The distributions were consolidated so as to reduce the physical strain of the ceremony on Elizabeth as she aged. The red purse contains £1 representing the money for redemption of the monarch's gown, £3 in lieu of the clothing once given, and £1.50 in place of the food once presented, totalling £5.50. In 2024, for the ceremony at Worcester Cathedral, the £5.50 not given in Maundy money took the form of a £5 coin with the image of a Tudor dragon and a 50p recognising the Royal National Lifeboat Institution's 200th anniversary.

One man and one woman are chosen for each year the monarch has lived (including the year the monarch is currently living), and they receive Maundy money equivalent in pence to that number of years. Recipients attend a "Maundy Lecture" in the cathedral in advance of the service to familiarise them with what will happen. The cathedral is designated the Royal Chapel for the day of the service, and the Royal Standard flies. The purses are carried into the church by the Yeomen on silver dishes, held above their heads. The origin of this custom is uncertain but apparently dates from the times when provisions were distributed to the poor; some experts believe the dishes were carried high to stop the poor from grabbing at the food prematurely; others believe that the position was to prevent the congregation from being overwhelmed by the smell of fish.

The Order of Service for Royal Maundy is a simple one. It begins with the reading of John 13:34, which contains the mandatum from which Royal Maundy evolved. It contains two lessons, the first of which (John 13) also recalls the mandatum. The second reading contains that portion of Matthew 25 which describes the Last Judgment. The monarch makes half of the presentations after the first lesson, and half after the second. Anthems, led by the Chapel Royal choir and the local choir, are sung while the distribution is going on, concluding with George Frideric Handel's coronation anthem "Zadok the Priest". The Royal Maundy service concludes with prayers, "God Save the King" and the blessing. Two hymns are sung; there is no address. Six silver dishes are used to hold the gifts; one, the traditional Maundy Dish, forms part of the Royal Regalia and is held at the Tower of London when not in use. All six dishes date from the reign of Charles II; five of the six have been added to the service since 1971. They are held by the Yeomen as the monarch walks about, greeting recipients and giving them their gifts. The Lord High Almoner receives his only recompense for his position if he attends the Royal Maundy service—a small fee, though payable in Maundy money.

The Pope still performs the pedilavium, as does the Archbishop of Canterbury. In recent years, the pedilavium has become more popular across Christian denominations, and even as a gesture of humility among those serving the poor. Today, the Royal Maundy ceremony involves a considerable security operation, with drains in the area checked. Two 17-year-old boys were arrested in Wakefield in 2005 for popping balloons in the area of the service, as the sound could have been mistaken for gunfire.

The monarch interacts informally with the Maundy recipients, it is said, some of whom have given gifts in return—one participant handed Queen Elizabeth II a jar of marmalade. Mercia Tapsell, a 71-year-old Maundy recipient who participated in the 1992 ceremony at Chester for her work with the Salvation Army, spoke of the ceremony before her death in July of that year:

It surpassed anything that I ever thought. I didn't ever think that I should be in the cathedral with the Queen and all the dignitaries that were there. And the singing, the organ, the Queen, just everything and everybody. It's really been out of this world. Just to hear Zadok the Priest, I think, has lifted me to Cloud Nine, because it's something that I love. And to hear that and to have the Queen pass so close to me. And yes, she smiled. She smiled at me.

== Maundy coinage ==
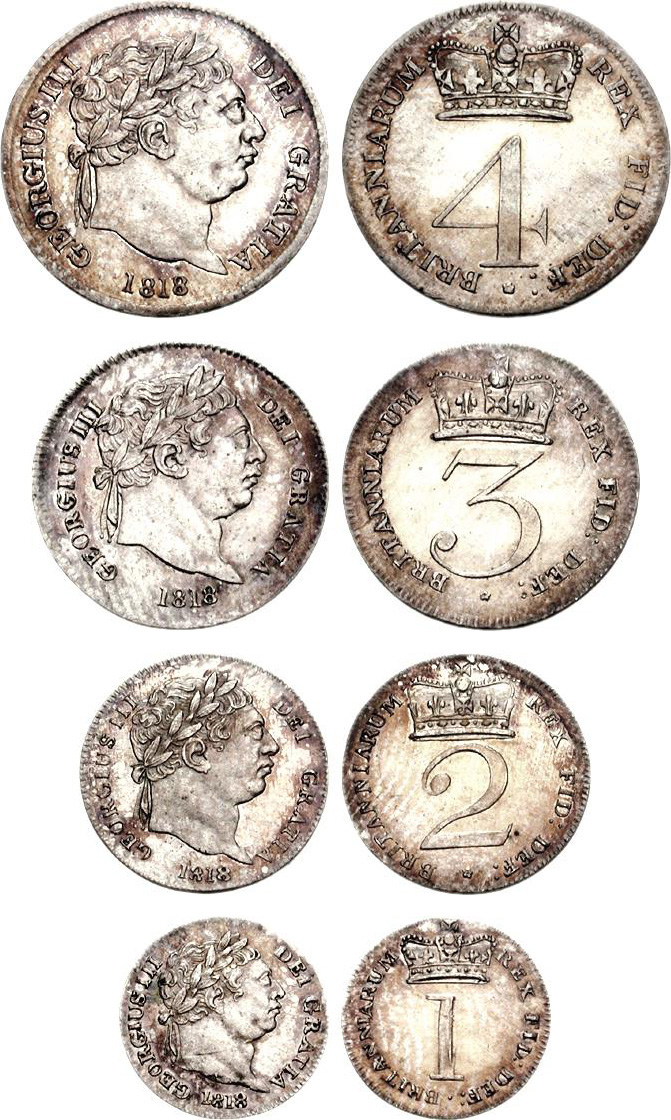
A set of George III Maundy money dated 1818, the obverse of which bear an 1817 design by Benedetto Pistrucci; the reverse design was first introduced in 1688, designer uncertain, but possibly the medallist George Bower.

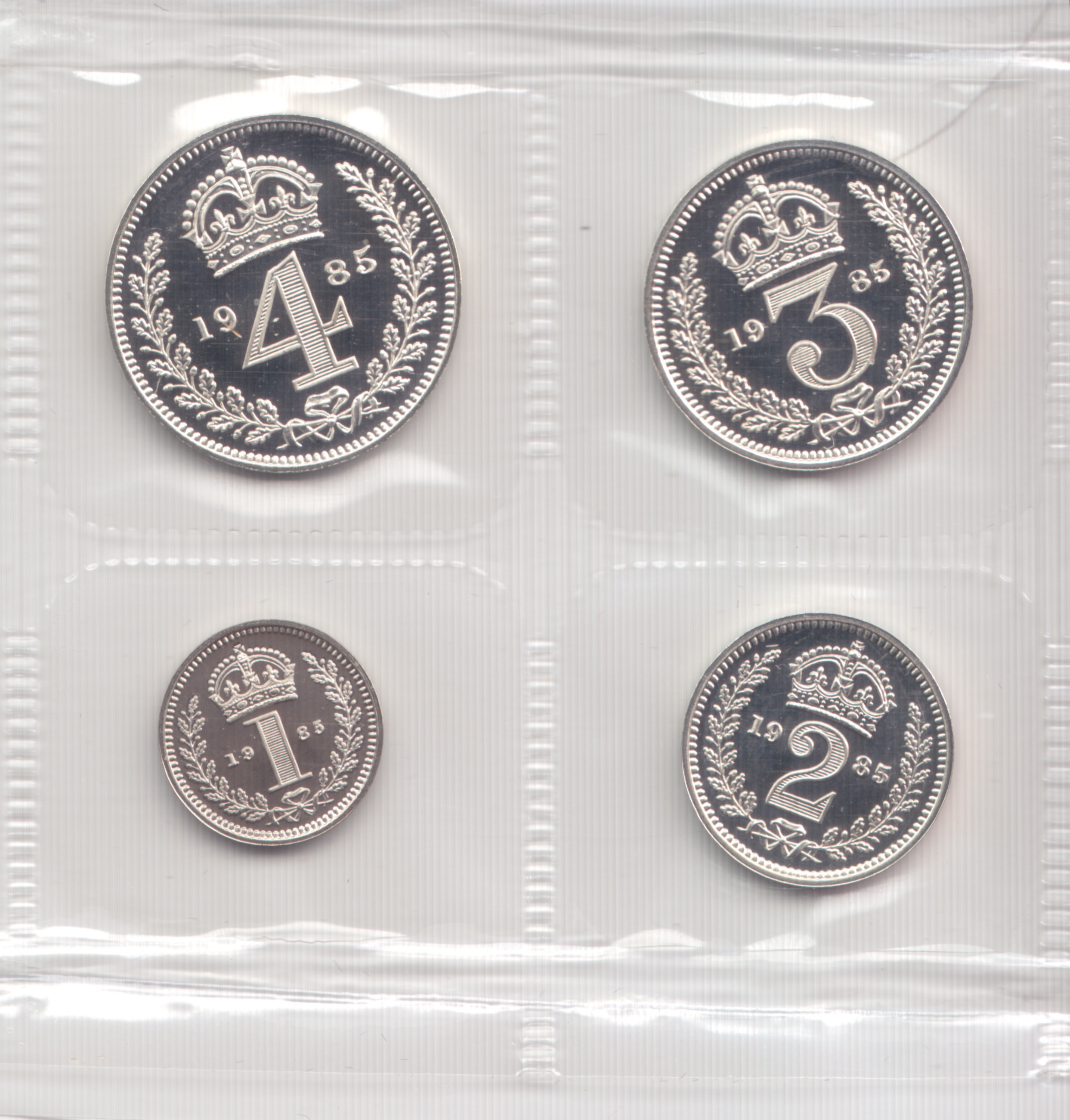
One of the 1,248 complete sets of 1985 Maundy money, in its plastic envelope of issue.

=== Development and design ===
Sets of 1d (one penny) to 4d silver coins are known from the time of Charles II onwards. There is no record of any denomination higher than 1d (then struck for circulation in silver) being used in the Maundy gift before 1731; sets from before then are most likely ordinary circulation strikes. At that time, coins used for the Maundy money distribution were indistinguishable from those struck for circulation. It was not until 1752 that coins not struck for circulation were used for the Maundy distribution. At times when little silver was being struck by the Royal Mint, the coins distributed might bear a previous year's date. To evade statutory prohibitions on the striking of silver coin during the Napoleonic Wars, all Maundy pieces issued from 1800 to 1815 bear the date 1800, though most were struck later. When the date was finally changed in 1816, after the prohibition ended, the size of the coins was slightly reduced, as the Royal Mint increased the amount struck from one troy pound of sterling silver from 62 to 66 shillings of silver coin. The last year in which no Maundy coins were struck was 1821.

In 1689, the Royal Mint began using a design for the reverse of the four low-denomination silver coins depicting a crowned numeral. The designer is unknown (Richard Lobel, in his catalogue of British coins, suggests the artist was George Bower, an employee of the Royal Mint whose medals bear similar characteristics) but his work has endured, in a revised form, for over 300 years. In 1822 an amended reverse was introduced, and has been struck every year since then in all four denominations. The 1822 reverse design, which places the crowned numeral within an oak wreath, was created by Jean Baptiste Merlen. This design is still struck each year, though the crown was altered in 1888, as was the appearance of the numeral "2" on the twopence. These changes were made by Royal Mint engraver Leonard Charles Wyon. A proposal by the Royal Mint in 1950 to return to the pre-1888 "2" as more artistic was refused by George VI, who felt the current numeral was stylistically similar to the numerals on the other coins, and the pre-1888 "2" was not.

Beginning in 1834, threepence (3d) pieces were struck for circulation, bearing the same design as the Maundy 3d. The circulation pieces were initially struck for use in the West Indies, but beginning in 1845, were coined for use in Britain as well. Many of the 3d pieces presented to impoverished Maundy recipients were spent, and these are rarer than the other values today. Maundy 3ds may sometimes be distinguished from currency 3ds as dies with a more polished field were used for the Maundy pieces. The design of the circulation 3d remained the same as that of the Maundy 3d until 1927, when a new design was introduced for the circulating coins. Twopence coins identical to Maundy pieces, intended for colonial use, were struck in 1838, 1843, and 1848.

The original composition of the coins was sterling (0.925) silver. In common with all British silver coins, the fineness was reduced to 0.500 in 1921. In 1947 silver was removed from all circulating British coinage in favour of cupronickel, but as it was felt to be inappropriate to strike Maundy coins in base metal, their fineness was restored to 0.925. On Decimal Day, 15 February 1971, the pound sterling became decimalised, with 100 new pence instead of 20 shillings of 12 pence (240 pence) in a pound. No change was made to the design of the Maundy pieces, and all Maundy pieces, both pre- and post-Decimal Day, are by law deemed denominated in new pence, more than doubling the face value of the pre-1971 pieces. The Maundy pieces continued to use the original obverse design for Queen Elizabeth II by Mary Gillick, although the bust of the Queen on other British coins was repeatedly replaced as she aged. At the time of decimalisation, the Royal Mint Advisory Commission recommended the retention out of affection for the Gillick design; this was accepted by the Queen.

After seventy years of use of the Gillick portrait on Elizabeth's Maundy coinage, coins were distributed in 2023 with a new obverse. These used the official coinage portrait of King Charles by Martin Jennings.

=== Distribution and resale ===
In the 19th century, as many as sixty times the number of pieces needed for the ceremony were struck, due to public interest in the ceremony and the pieces. Beginning in 1846, Queen Victoria requested pieces for her private use, as much as £10 (2,400 pence) per year. Many sets were purchased by coin dealers, others by Mint officials as gifts. Small quantities of Maundy twopences and fourpences (principally the latter) were obtained by colleges at the University of Cambridge for use in making token annual payments. These requests were fulfilled until the middle of the 20th century, after which the Royal Mint refused them; the colleges thereafter used obsolete circulation groats (fourpences), or dispensed with the custom.

According to Robinson, the practice of recipients being asked to sell their gifts "is of long standing". Robinson recounts a description of the scenes after a Maundy service at the turn of the 19th century:

[A]s soon as the service is over, crowds of buyers flock eagerly around the old people, who take a price for their coins. The rate they usually charge is four or five times the face value of the coins. The purses are sometimes disposed of at from one to two shillings each, depending on the market.

By 1897, Maundy recipients were being urged to sell the small pieces at a premium; there are tales of Americans paying high prices for a set that year, wanting a souvenir of Victoria's Diamond Jubilee.

In 1903, the Royal Mint made its first effort to cut back on the number of pieces distributed, eliminating 200 Mint workers (principally charwomen and labourers) from the distribution list. Until 1908 Maundy sets could be ordered through banks. Beginning in 1909, however, distribution of the pieces was restricted to Maundy recipients and certain officials. Mintage of sets of Maundy money dropped from 9,929 in 1908 to 2,428 the following year. By 1932, Maundy recipients were routinely selling the coins to dealers at a premium. There was little official response to this until the 1960s, when questions were asked in the House of Lords after the press reported that recipients were being approached by dealers after the service and being offered cash for their gifts. In response, the Royal Mint decreased the number of sets available to officials, though Royal Mint employees of long service are offered the opportunity, every few years, to purchase a set. A number of sets are used as prizes for students at Westminster School, a practice said to have begun with Elizabeth I, though this now occurs only in years when the service is held at Westminster Abbey. Sets distributed by the Royal Mint in these ways are not given in purses, but in presentation cases.

In recent years, approximately 1,600–1,900 sets have been minted. Additional sets have been struck for inclusion in special silver proof sets marketed by the Royal Mint in 1996, 2000 and 2006, with a special issue in gold as part of a gold proof set in 2002. Individual Maundy recipients have realised as much as £100 per set of four pieces by selling them on eBay.

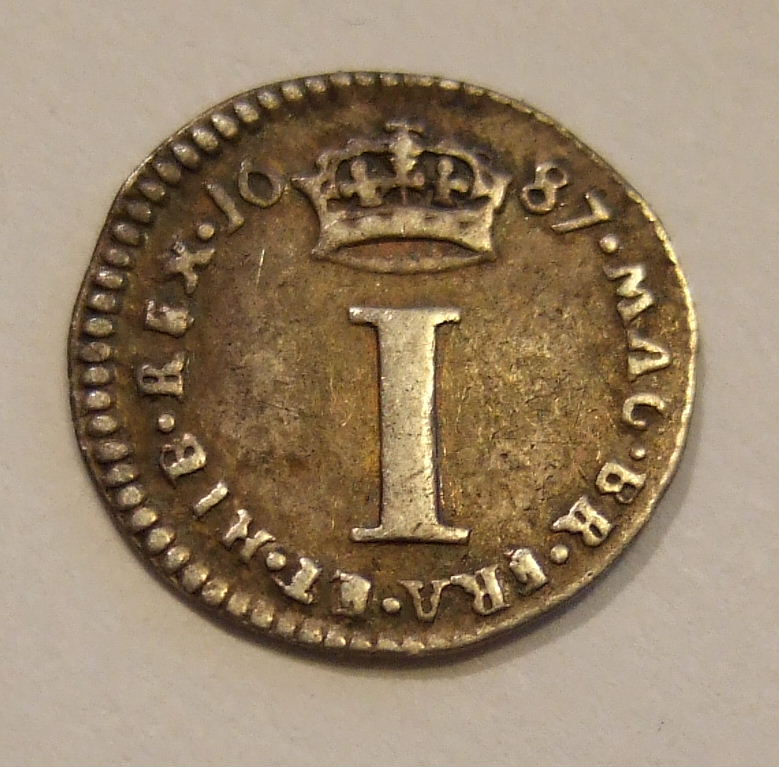
Reverse of a 1687 circulation penny, often deemed a Maundy penny.

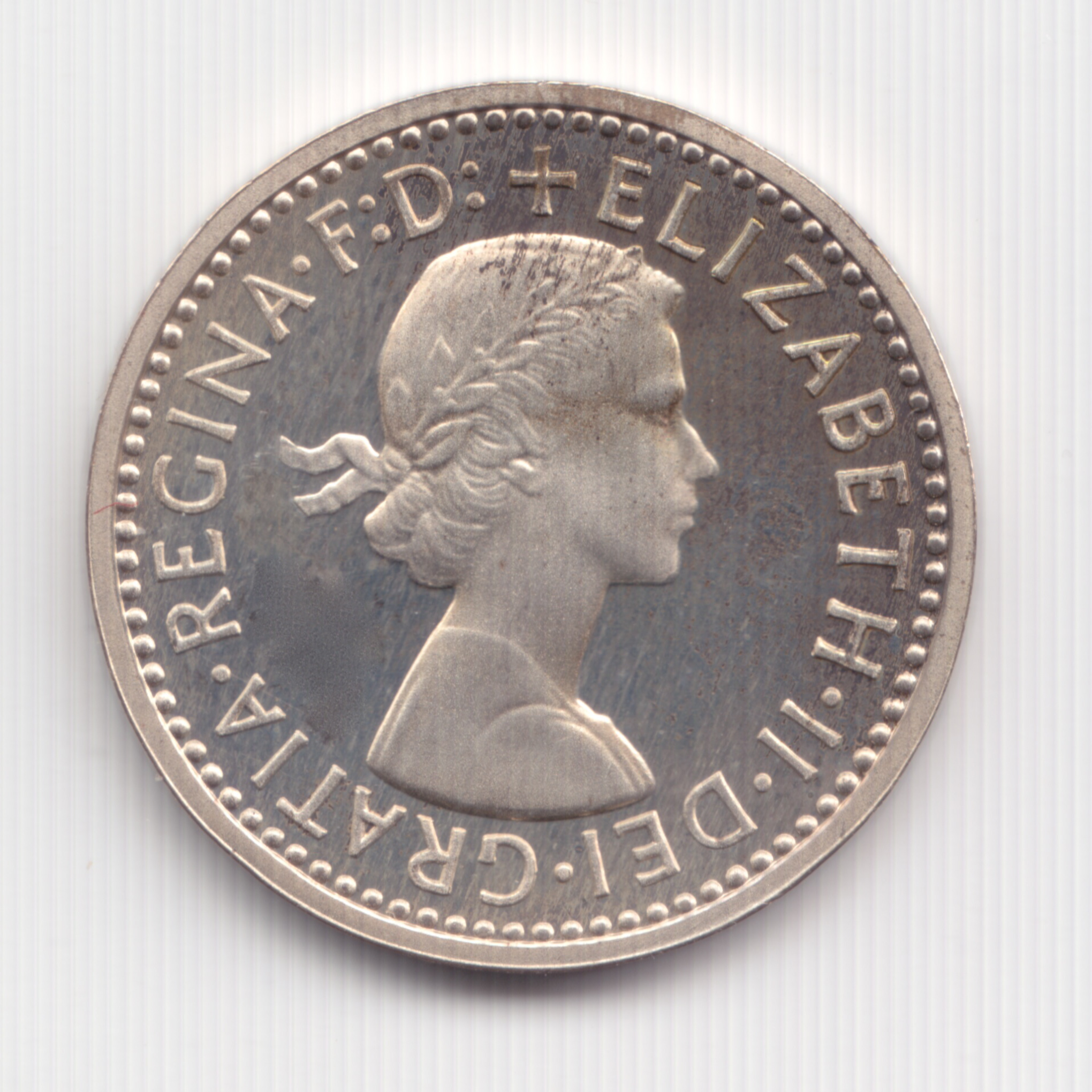
A 1982 Maundy fourpence; like all Elizabeth II Maundy pieces, it bears an obverse design by Mary Gillick which had long-since been replaced by other designs for circulating coins.

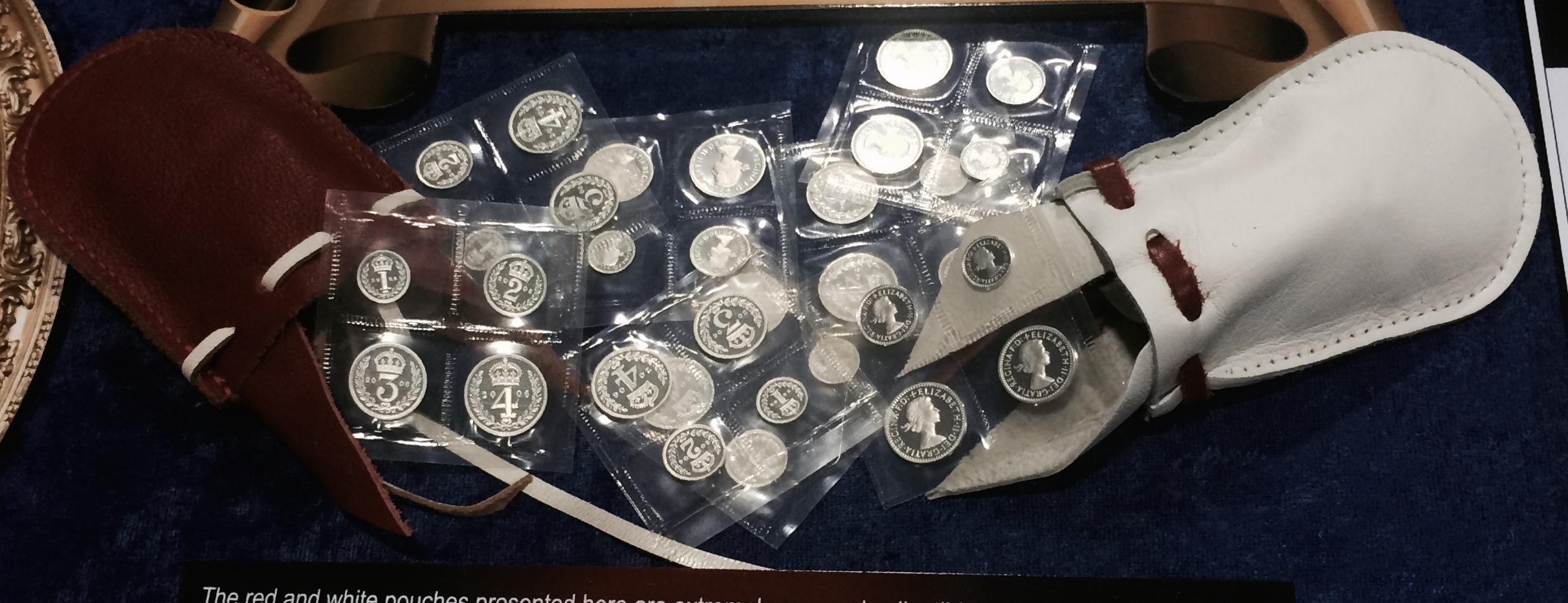
Bags and coins given to a 2006 Maundy recipient

=== Specifications (since 1816) ===
Maundy coin specifications (since 1816)
Coin (pence)	Weight (g)	Weight (troy ounce)	Diameter (mm)	Diameter (in)
1	0.47	1/66	11.15	0.44
2	0.94	1/33	13.44	0.529
3	1.41	1/22	16.26	0.640
4	1.89	2/33	17.63	0.694

== See also ==
- Touch piece

== Bibliography ==
- Allison, Ronald; Riddell, Sarah, eds. (1991). The Royal Encyclopedia. Macmillan Press. ISBN 978-0-333-53810-4.
- Bressett, Kenneth (1964). A Guide Book of English Coins: Nineteenth and Twentieth Centuries (3rd ed.). Whitman Publishing Co.
- Cole, Virginia A. (2002). "Ritual charity and royal children in thirteenth-century England". In Rollo-Koster, Joëlle (ed.). Medieval and Early Modern Ritual: Formalized Behavior in Europe, China, and Japan. BRILL. ISBN 978-90-04-11749-5.
- Lobel, Richard (1999). Coincraft's 2000 Standard Catalogue of English and UK Coins, 1066 to Date. Standard Catalogue Publishers Ltd. ISBN 978-0-9526228-8-8.
- Robinson, Brian (1977). The Royal Maundy. Kaye and Ward. ISBN 978-0-7182-1151-6.
- Robinson, Brian (1992). Silver Pennies & Linen Towels: The Story of the Royal Maundy. Spink & Sons Ltd. ISBN 978-0-907605-35-5.
- Seaby, Peter (1985). The Story of British Coinage. B.A. Seaby Ltd. ISBN 978-0-900652-74-5.
- Welfare, Simon; Bruce, Alastair (1993). Days of Majesty. Michael O'Mara Books Ltd. ISBN 978-1-85479-108-5.
- Wright, Peter A. (1990). The Story of the Royal Maundy (revised ed.). Pitkin Pictorials. ISBN 978-0-85372-490-2.
