= Despatch box =

Ministerial file holder

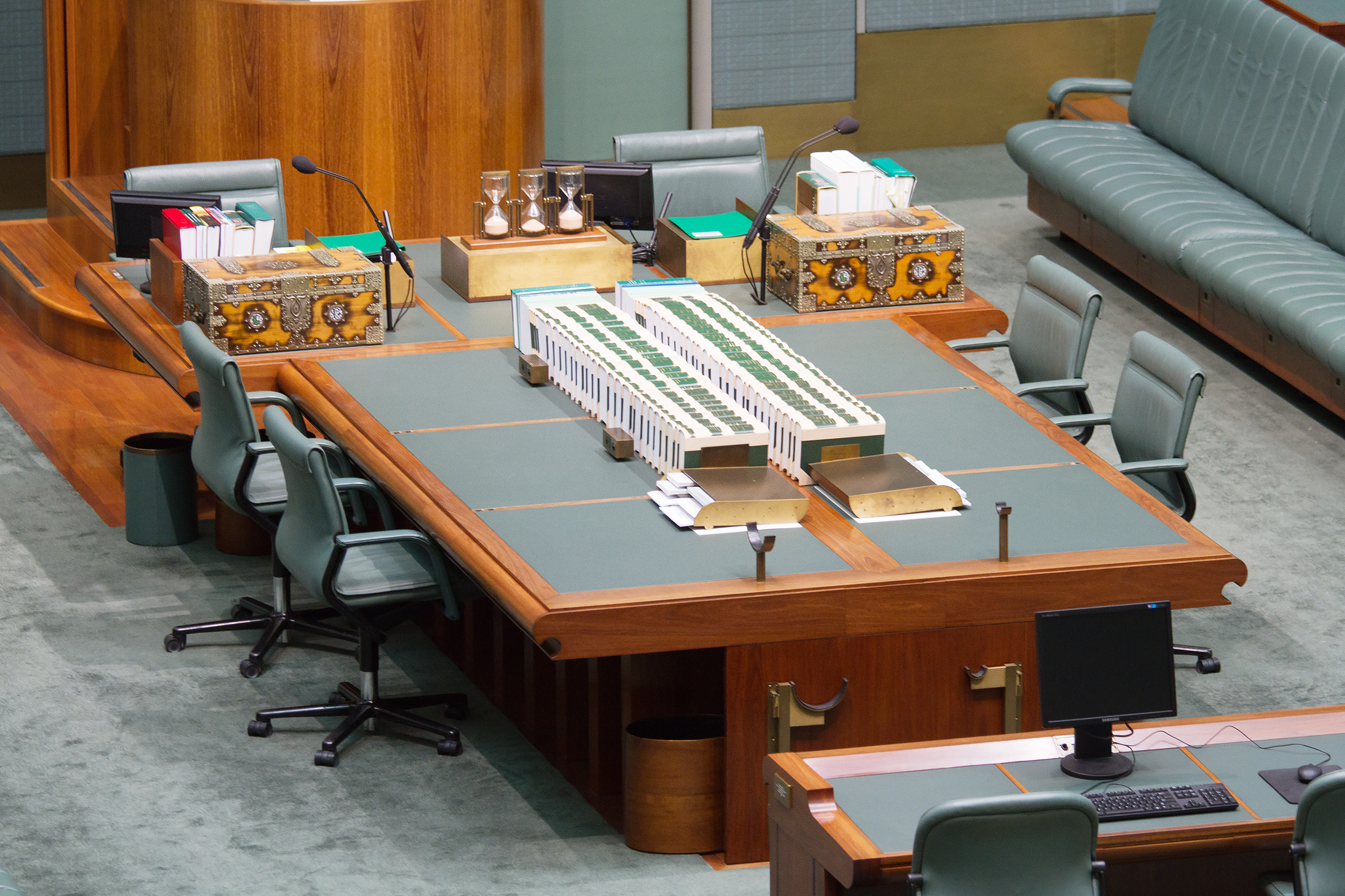
The parliamentary despatch boxes in Australia's House of Representatives. The left box is used by the Government; the right box by the Opposition.

A despatch box (alternatively dispatch box) is one of several types of boxes used in government business. Despatch boxes primarily include both those sometimes known as red boxes or ministerial boxes, which are used by the Sovereign and his ministers in the British government to securely transport sensitive documents, and boxes used in the lower houses of the parliaments of the United Kingdom and Australia. The term was used as early as the reign of Queen Elizabeth I, referring to a box used to carry an important message for the Queen.

These ministerial boxes, generally red, are now an iconic symbol of the British government. Despatch boxes of a different design and generally made of wood are used as lecterns from which frontbench members of parliament delivered speeches to their parliamentary chamber. They were originally used for members to carry bills and other documents into the chamber. The Australian House of Representatives and the House of Commons each keep a pair of ornate wooden despatch boxes, usually with one box on the government side and one on the opposition side of the table that divides the opposing frontbenches. Whereas backbenchers in both parliaments generally deliver addresses to the chamber while standing at their seat, frontbenchers (ministers and shadow ministers) deliver their addresses from their side's despatch box. By tradition, the modern despatch boxes often contain the religious texts used for swearing in new members of the respective chamber.

There are two variant spellings in current English: dispatch or despatch, with the former being more common in English today, though the latter is favoured by the government when referring to the boxes, and is first attested in the 1580s as referring to an important message.

== Ministerial red boxes ==
Red despatch boxes are today issued to every minister in the British government, each personalised with the title of both the owner and recipient. For example, the budget box is labelled as belonging to the Chancellor of the Exchequer. According to the government,

Ministers are permitted to use ordinary lockable briefcases to transport information which has been classified 'confidential' or below. For information with a higher security level (such as 'secret') they are required to use dispatch boxes, which offer a higher level of security, and which are usually red.

Due to the importance of the boxes to government ministers, many become attached to them as a reminder of their time in office. Some have bought them from their former departments – after paying to have the bespoke security feature removed. Others have, as is their right, gone to the secretive manufacturer of red boxes, Barrow & Gale or Wickwar & Co, to have a new box specially made.

== Parliamentary despatch boxes ==
=== Australian parliamentary boxes ===
The despatch boxes in the Australian House of Representatives were gifts from King George V to mark the opening of the Old Parliament House in Canberra on 9 May 1927. They are made of rosewood and have enamel and silver decorations. They are replicas of the despatch boxes that were kept in the British House of Commons until their destruction on 10 May 1941. Inside the lid of each box is an inscription signed by George V.

The Senate has two lecterns which serve a similar purpose, but they are used only by the Senate leaders of the Government and Opposition rather than by all frontbenchers. Other frontbenchers in the Senate address the chamber from their seating location in the first row of their side of the chamber.

=== British parliamentary boxes ===
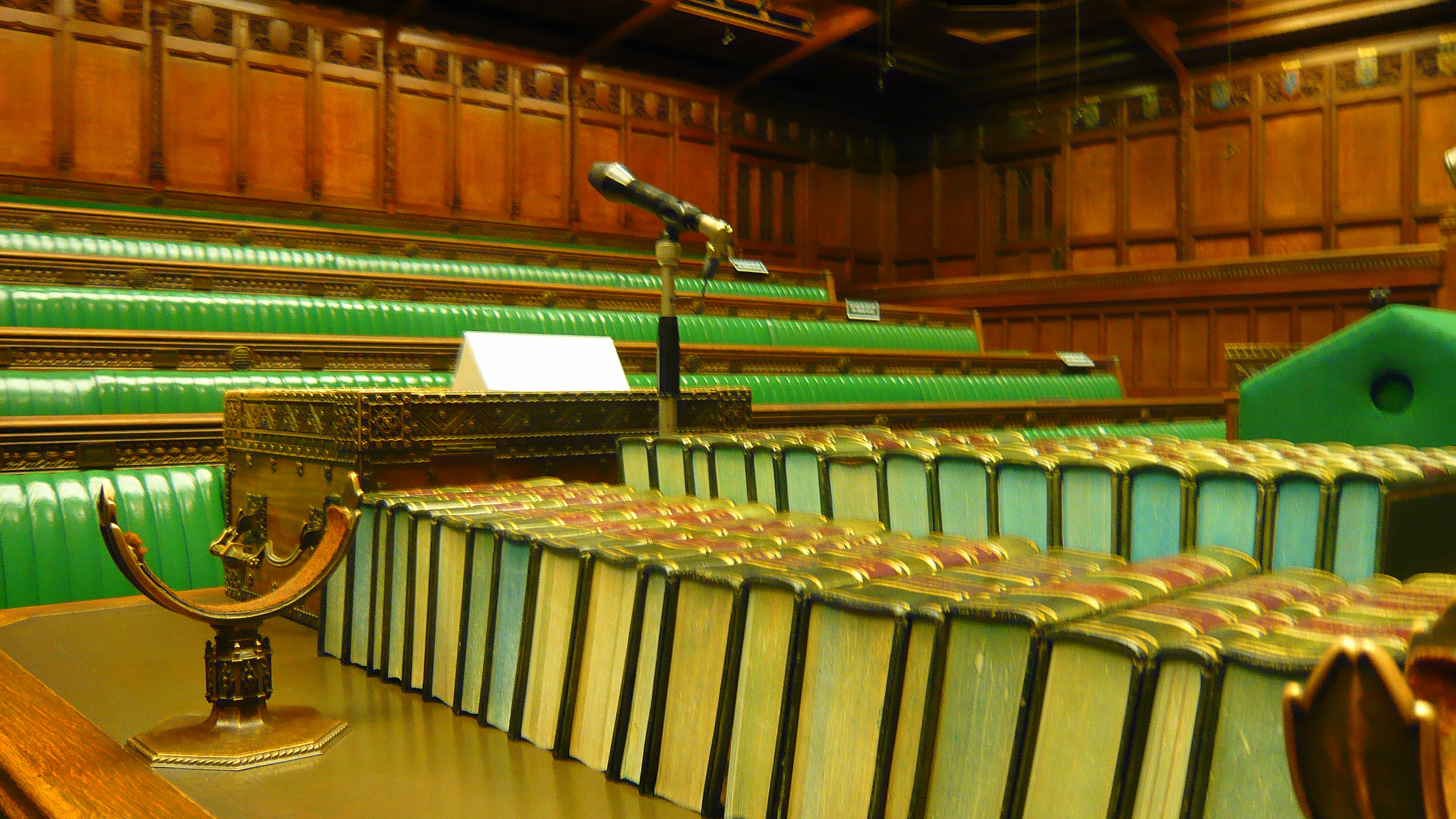
The box on the government side

The current despatch boxes in the British House of Commons were gifts from New Zealand, presented after the House of Commons was rebuilt following World War II. They are made of pūriri wood and are modelled on the Australian boxes, which are replicas of the original British despatch boxes destroyed in World War II.

The box on the Government side contains holy books of various religions. The Opposition box contains a Bible, which was resting on the centre table when a German bomb fell on the Commons chamber on 10 May 1941, in the Second World War; it was subsequently recovered largely intact.

More recently, the Government despatch box is reported to have sustained damage at the hands of former Prime Minister Gordon Brown. Brown's habit of jabbing his marker pen at his papers left black pen marks on the surface of the box.
