= Charles Solomon (racketeer) =

Russian-born mob boss

Charles "King" Solomon
- Born: Charles Solomon; 1884; Russian Empire
- Died: January 24, 1933 (aged 48–49); Boston, Massachusetts, U.S.
- Cause of death: Shot by rival gunmen
- Years active: 1900s-1933
- Conviction: Perjury
- Penalty: 5 years imprisonment (served 13 months, 1922)

Charles "King" Solomon (1884 – January 24, 1933) was a Russian-born mob boss who controlled Boston's bootlegging, narcotics, and illegal gambling during the Prohibition era.

== Biography ==
One of the earliest organized crime figures in New England's history, Solomon immigrated from the Russian Empire as a boy settling with his family in Boston's West End. The son of a local theater owner, Solomon and his three brothers came from a middle-class Jewish background and, during his teenage years, he worked as a counterman in his uncle's restaurant. However, by his early 20s, he had become involved in prostitution, fencing and bail bonding prior to Prohibition.

By the early 1920s, he controlled the majority of illegal gambling and narcotics, such as cocaine and morphine, before expanding into bootlegging during Prohibition, owning many of the cities' most prominent speakeasies, including the Cocoanut Grove nightclub. He enjoyed extensive contacts throughout the underworld, including the Bronfmans in Canada as well as associates in New York and Chicago.

Solomon was tried on narcotics charges in 1922. Represented by editor and general councillor of the Boston American Grenville MacFarlane, which had then been crusading against drug abuse, he was later acquitted of those charges. He would, however, serve thirteen months of a five-year prison sentence at Atlanta Federal Penitentiary for intimidating a witness into perjury at his narcotics trial. During his imprisonment, a request for his transfer to a prison closer to Boston was made by Boston Congressmen George H. Tinkham and James A. Gallivan.

Attending the Atlantic City Conference in 1929, Solomon was one of the several leaders in the "Big Seven" who helped negotiate territorial disputes and establish policies which would influence the later National Crime Syndicate in 1932. Solomon continued to control illegal gambling in New England until his death on January 24, 1933, when he was murdered in the men's room of Boston's Cotton Club by rival gunmen John Burke and James Coyne. His territories were eventually divided up among his lieutenants Joseph Linsey, Hyman Abrams and brothers Max and Louis Fox.

Solomon and three others had been indicted in Brooklyn in early January 1933 on charges of operating a liquor smuggling ring. Two months after Solomon was killed, another of the indicted men, Alexander Lillien, was murdered at his house in New Jersey.

== Popular culture ==
- Charles Solomon is briefly mentioned in the HBO TV series Boardwalk Empire by Joe Kennedy, who refers to him as “King Solomon”.
- A fictionalized version of Charles Solomon is mentioned in the BBC series Peaky Blinders in the second episode of the final season. However, he is known as “Charles Solomons”, and is an uncle of the character Alfie Solomons; portrayed by Tom Hardy.
