= Red box (government) =

Despatch box for UK government documents

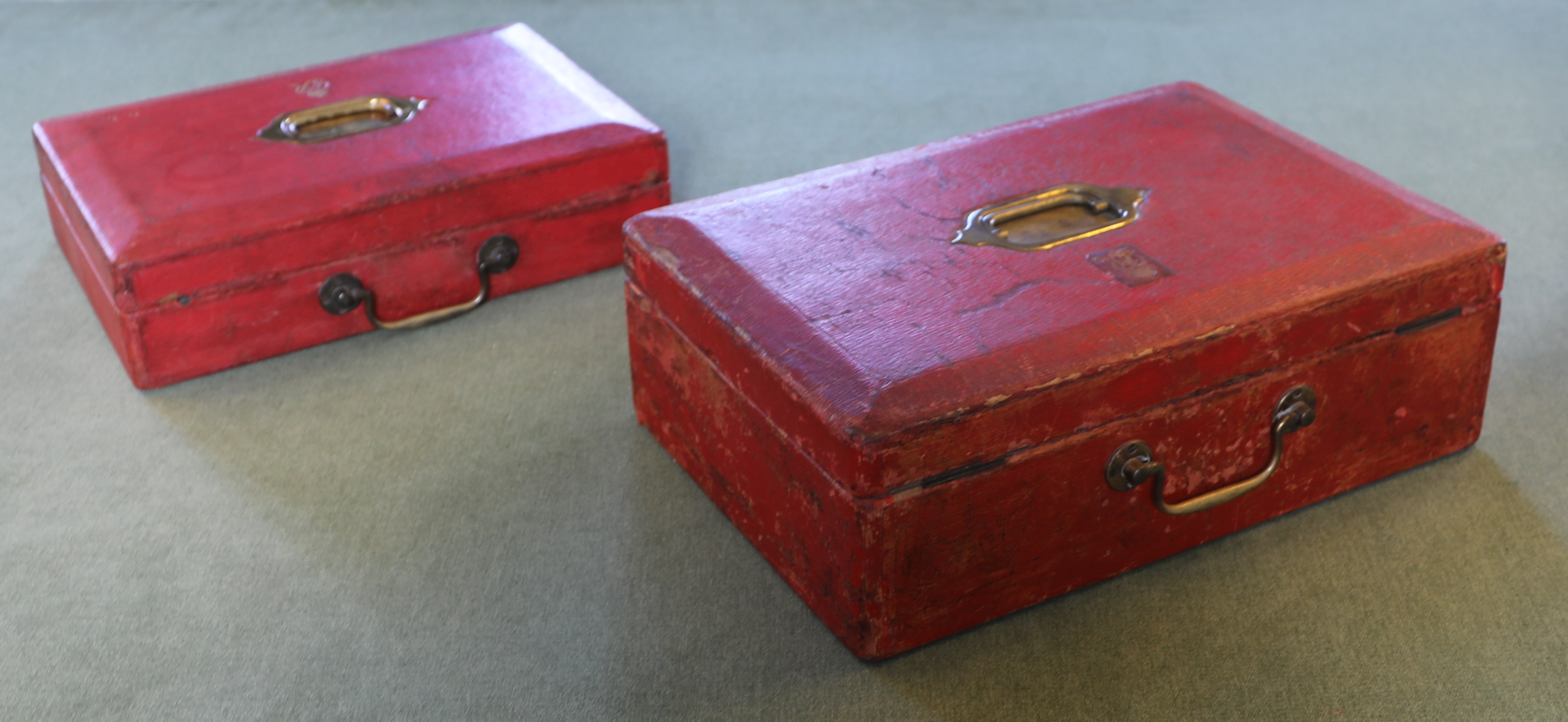
A pair of despatch boxes

Red boxes, or sometimes ministerial boxes, are a type of despatch box produced by Barrow Hepburn & Gale or Wickwar & Co and are used by ministers in the British government and the British monarch to carry government documents. Similar in appearance to a briefcase, they are primarily used to hold and transport official ministerial papers.

Red boxes are one modern form of despatch boxes, which have been in government use for centuries. Despatch boxes of a very different design remain in use in the chamber of the lower house of the British and Australian parliaments. Those boxes hold religious books for swearing-in new members of the chamber, but are also used as lecterns by front bench members.

== Ministerial boxes ==
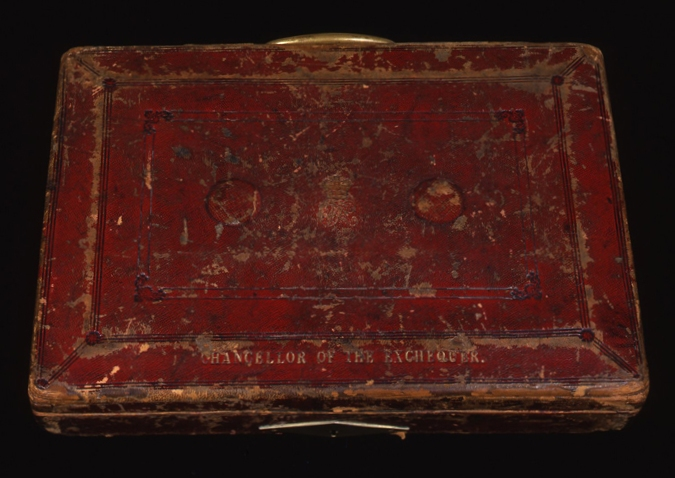
Budget box of William Gladstone, who was Chancellor of the Exchequer four times between 1852 and 1882

According to HM Treasury:

Ministers are permitted to use ordinary lockable briefcases to transport information which has been classified 'Confidential' or below. For information with a higher security level (such as 'Secret') they are required to use dispatch boxes, which offer greater security, and which are usually red. However, a travel version of the box is also available in black, which offers the same level of security as a red box, but is designed to be less conspicuous. In practice ministers use despatch boxes for transporting the majority of their documents due to the greater level of security they offer.

=== Historical and famous red boxes ===
The boxes are used by ministers daily while in government and thus become an important memory of their time in office, with many opting to buy and keep their red boxes. Many boxes owned and used by famous political figures from British history have been sold at auction. Those boxes represent some of the most important possessions of former prime ministers.

Margaret Thatcher's ministerial dispatch box was sold at auction by Christie's in 2015 for £242,500. Winston Churchill's red box (manufactured by Wickwar) was sold by Sotheby's in 2014 for £158,500, 25 times the estimated price.

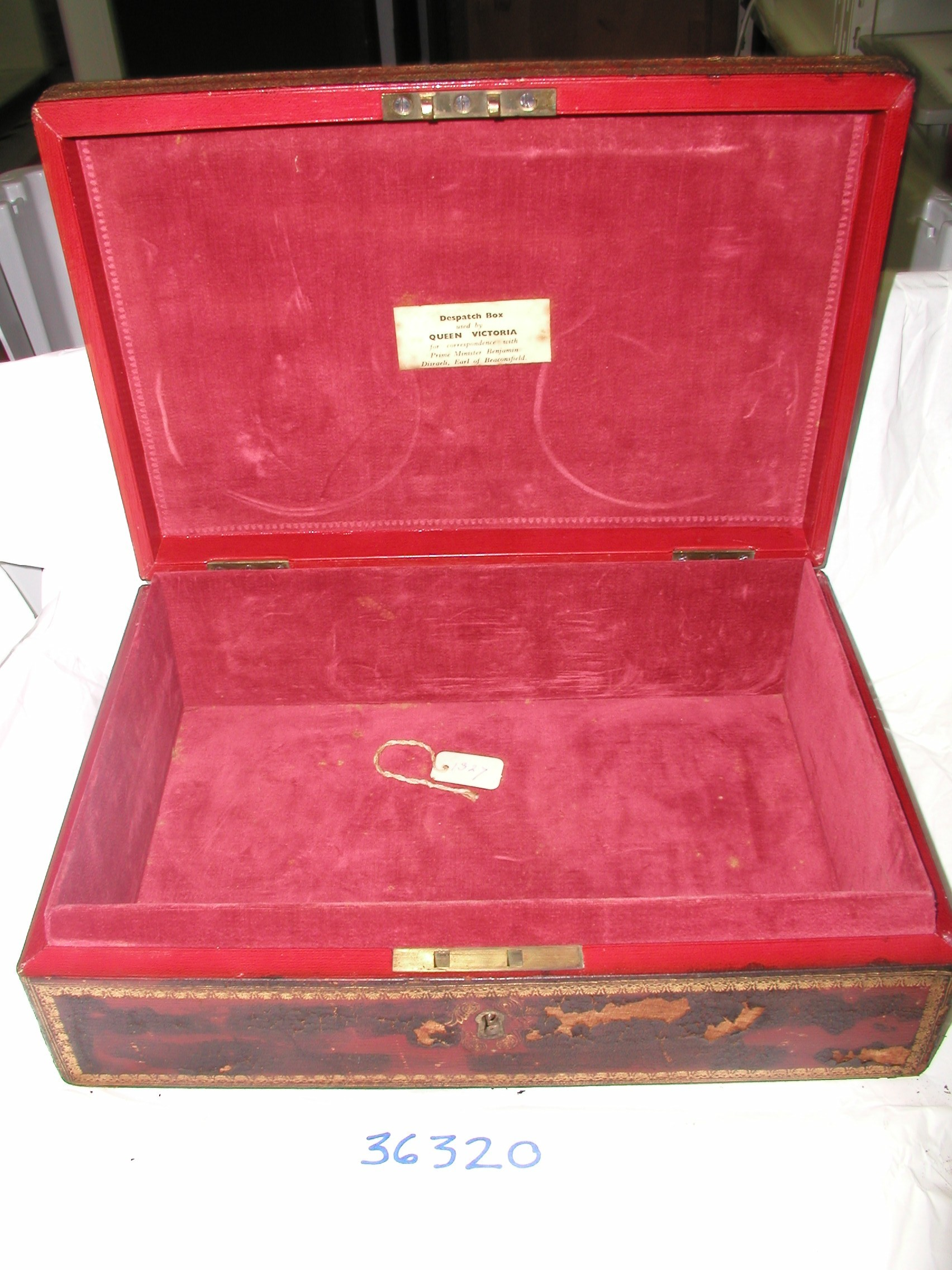
Box used by Queen Victoria to communicate with Benjamin Disraeli

Red boxes are often given to the outgoing President of the United States as a symbol of the relationship between the US and UK governments. George W. Bush received one such box from Tony Blair.

Donald Trump coveted a red box but frustration grew within the British government over the 8-10 week manufacturing period for the box, as it was intended to present it to him during his 2025 state visit to the United Kingdom. The Ambassador of the United Kingdom to the United States Peter Mandelson wrote to the Downing Street Chief of Staff Morgan McSweeney that "Whitehall has known about since February and it was confirmed in early July and nobody had the wit to say anything. What incompetence". Mandelson also likened the attempt to obtain the box to the BBC political sitcom The Thick of It.

== Design ==
The boxes are manufactured by Barrow Hepburn & Gale or Wickwar & Co to the original Wickwar design. The 2–3-kilogram (4–7 lb) boxes are constructed of slow-grown pine, lined with lead and black satin. The lead lining, which has been retained in modern boxes, was once meant to ensure that the box sank when thrown overboard in the event of capture. Each box takes three days to finish.

They are wrapped in leather and employ a bespoke print, which is applied after curing and staining. Each box is embossed in gold print with the royal cypher of the reigning monarch, the title of the owner and recipient of the red box, with the recipient's title given precedence. Each is also given a unique number to aid identification and control of the contents. Another unique feature of the boxes is the location of the handle on the hinge side, opposite of the lock, so that when placed on a desk, the lock faces the recipient, who has the key and the authority to access the contents of the box. That also ensures the box is locked before being carried.

=== Colour ===
Two reasons have been given for the use of red as the predominant colour of the despatch boxes used in government. One is that Prince Albert preferred the colour because it was the predominant one on the arms of the House of Saxe-Coburg-Gotha. However, it is also claimed that the practice began in the late 16th century, when Queen Elizabeth I's representative, Francis Throckmorton, presented the Spanish ambassador, Bernardino de Mendoza, with a specially-constructed red briefcase filled with black puddings.

Today, although 'red box' has now come to be synonymous with the despatch boxes, other colours are also used, to denote the many different functions of the boxes in Parliament.

Black is used for those boxes prepared for government whips and for discretion when boxes are designed for travel. There is believed to be blue box with a red stripe is used specifically for confidential papers only seen by the prime minister, their private secretary, and intelligence officials. This box is known as "Old Stripey" due to the red stripe. Permanent secretaries, who are civil servants rather than MPs or Lords, have similar boxes but coloured green. These have the same function as the ministerial red boxes. Barrow Hepburn & Gale have also made available despatch boxes in green for members of parliament.

William Hague, while Leader of the Opposition, had a blue box made for him with lettering denoting his office. It is not known whether a blue box is in use today.

=== Cost ===
One box cost £865.43 (equivalent to £1,337 in 2025) to make in 2010. Another box made in 2021 by Aldridge's cost £1,100 (equivalent to £1,362 in 2025). Between 2002 and 2007, the British government spent £57,260 on new boxes.

== Budget box ==
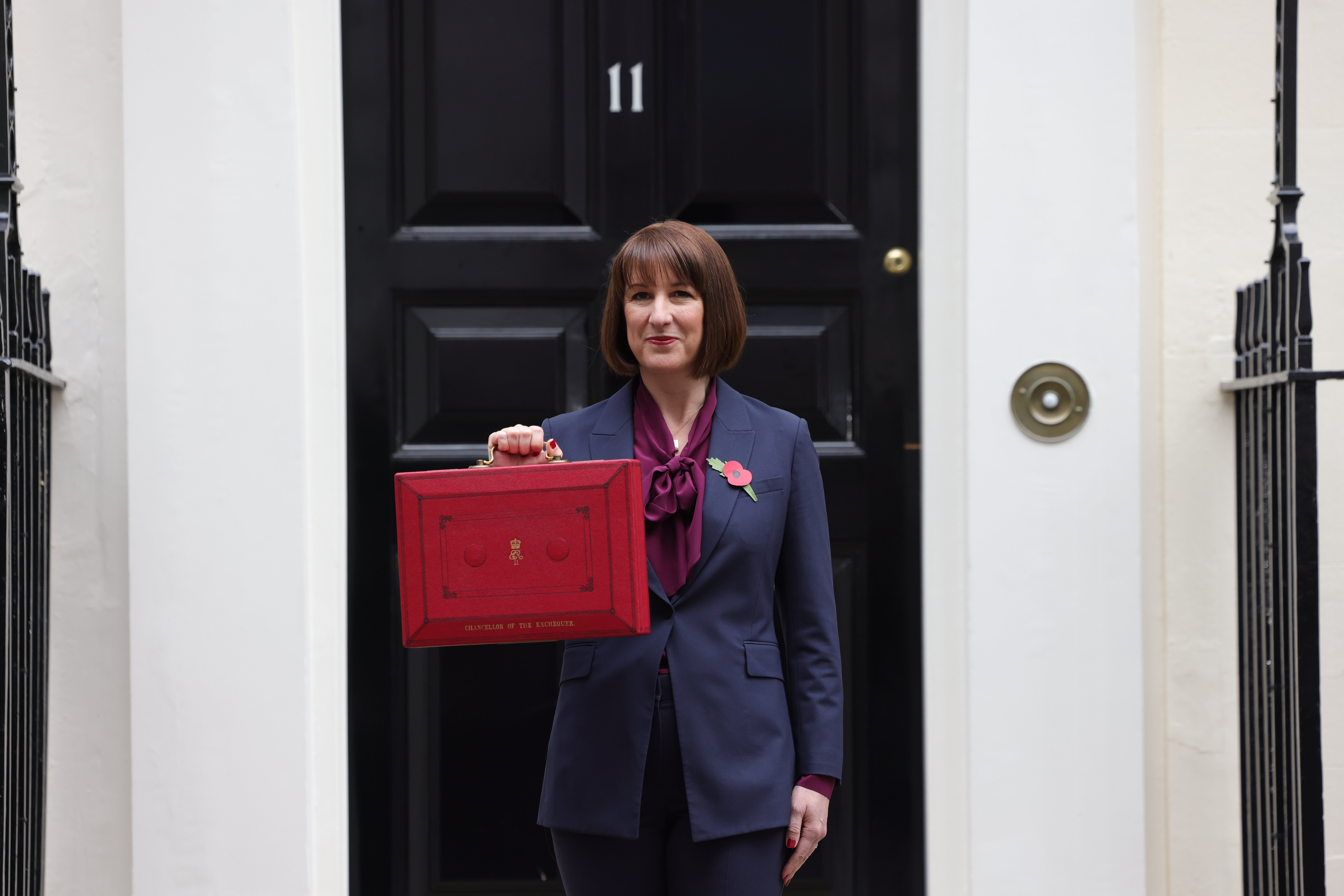
Rachel Reeves, the Chancellor of the Exchequer, holding the budget box to announce the 2024 autumn budget

There is a custom of the Chancellor of the Exchequer holding up a red box to the press in Downing Street to symbolise the new budget of the UK government. Rather than containing the new budget, the red box contains the chancellor's speech and notes.

The red box of William Ewart Gladstone was made by Wickwar & Co for his first budget in 1853. Gladstone served as Chancellor of the Exchequer on four occasions and held the post for longer than anyone in the UK's history.

Gladstone's red box was used by every subsequent chancellor until 2011, with the exceptions of James Callaghan (1964–1967) and Gordon Brown (1997–2007), who had new ones commissioned in 1965 and 1997 respectively: 51 chancellors for more than 150 years. Gladstone's budget box was used by Alistair Darling (2007–2010) and, for the last time, by George Osborne in June 2010.

The budget of the spring of 1868 was infamous for Chancellor George Ward-Hunt opening his dispatch box to find that he had left his speech at home.

Since March 2011, a new budget box commissioned by The National Archives has been used.

== Royal red boxes ==
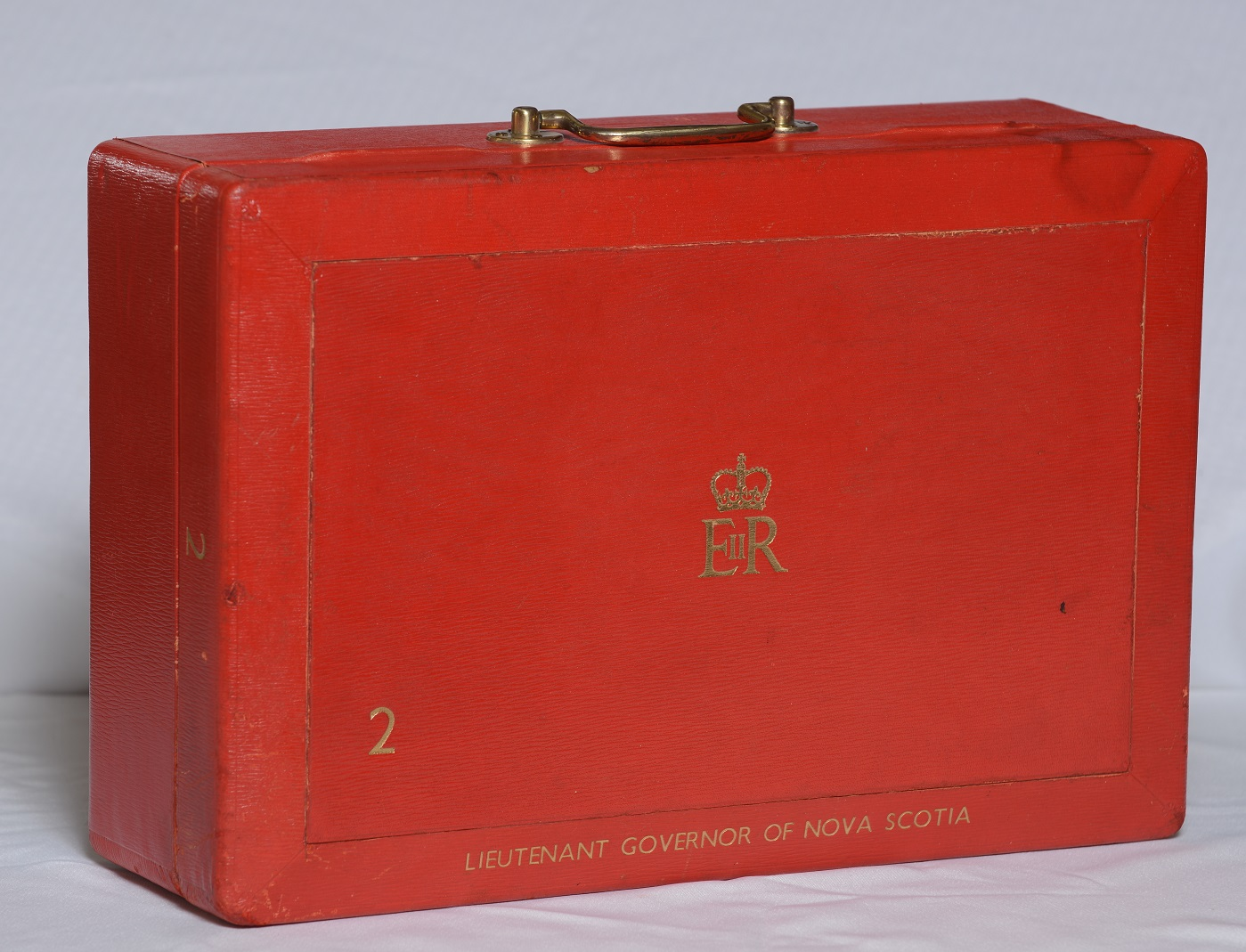
The Lieutenant Governor of Nova Scotia's red box

Red boxes are delivered to the British sovereign every day (except Christmas Day and Easter Sunday) by government departments, via the page of the presence. The monarch's role as head of state requires being kept abreast of what is happening in Parliament and the governments of all the other Commonwealth countries, as well as current events from around the world. Documents which the monarch must sign and provide royal assent for are delivered in red despatch boxes, which are addressed daily. Many governors general, governors and lieutenant governors in Commonwealth Realms also make use of red boxes.

== Scotland ==
The Scottish Government has nine blue Cabinet Secretary despatch boxes for its ministers.

== Singapore ==
Early in the independence of Singapore, ministers had red boxes similar to the British ones, but with the coat of arms of Singapore.

Education Minister Heng Swee Keat, formerly principal private secretary to Lee Kuan Yew, revealed in a Facebook post that Lee continued using the red box throughout his life until 4 February 2015, the day before his final hospitalisation.

== Sri Lanka ==
Traditionally the Minister of Finance used a red wooden box with the national emblem to carry the Cabinet's annual budget plans, similar to the budget box of the British government to symbolise the new budget, containing the minister's speech.

In 2022, the Sri Lanka Electrical and Mechanical Engineers produced several red boxes made of red leather designated as "Presidential Dispatch Bag" for the use of the President of Sri Lanka.
