= LFFF =

LFFF can stand for:

- London Fashion Film Festival
- London Fetish Film Festival
- Linear force-free field, see Force-free magnetic field#Linear force-free field
