= Dickens's London =

Locations in works by Charles Dickens

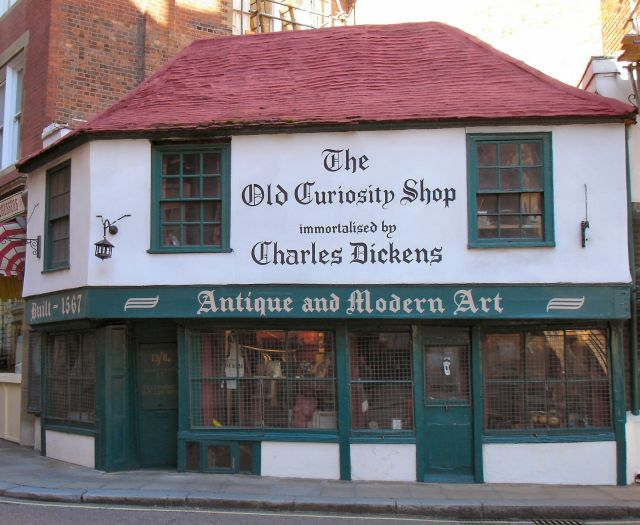
The Old Curiosity Shop in Holborn, London, which is said to have inspired The Old Curiosity Shop but has no proven relation to Dickens or his work.

The works of Charles Dickens are especially associated with London, which is the setting for many of his novels. These works do not just use London as a backdrop but are about the city and its character.

Dickens described London as a magic lantern, a popular entertainment of the Victorian era, which projected images from slides. Of all Dickens's characters, "none played as important a role in his work as that of London itself"; it fired his imagination and made him write. In a letter to John Forster in 1846, Dickens wrote "a day in London sets me up and starts me", but outside of the city, "the toil and labour of writing, day after day, without that magic lantern is IMMENSE!!"

Many of the identifiable London locations that Dickens used in his work no longer exist, although scholar Clare Pettitt notes that it is still possible to "track Dickens' London, and see where things were".

In addition to his later novels and short stories, Dickens's descriptions of London, published in various newspapers in the 1830s, were released as a collected edition Sketches by Boz in 1836. Dickens's first son, also called Charles Dickens, wrote a popular guidebook to London called Dickens's Dictionary of London in 1879.

== Locations ==
=== Pickwick Papers ===
Dickens's first novel The Posthumous Papers of the Pickwick Club (also known as The Pickwick Papers) follows the travels of the club's members around England and, between them, they stay in over one hundred Inns during their journeys. A selection of those in the London area, including the George and Vulture in Lombard Street and the Golden Cross at Charing Cross, were the subject of Bertram Waldrom Matz's 1921 book The inns & taverns of "Pickwick", with some observations on their other associations, and still feature on Pub crawl guides today.

=== Oliver Twist ===
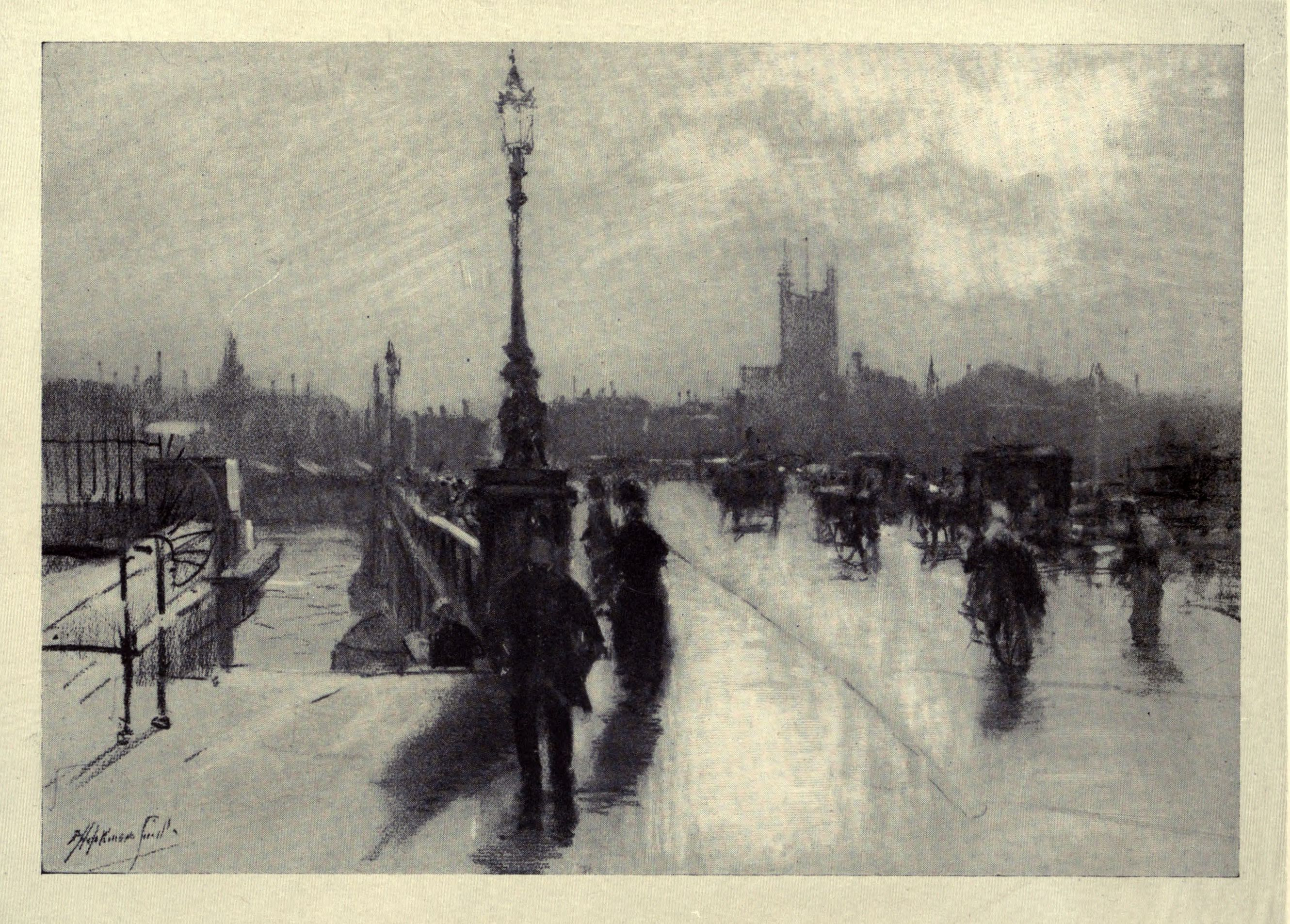
Illustration of London Bridge which Nancy crossed in Oliver Twist. This image appears in the book In Dickens's London (1914) by F. Hopkinson Smith

When Oliver joins the Artful Dodger to travel to Fagin's lair, they make their way through a series of streets until they reach the neighbourhood of Saffron Hill. While the novel's final scene is set on Jacob's Island, where the murderous Bill Sikes meets his death while trying to escape into part of the River Neckinger known as Folly's Ditch.

=== Little Dorrit ===
Charles Dickens's father was incarcerated in the debtors' prison of Marshalsea in Southwark, along with his wife and all their children except for Dickens and his sister Fanny, where much of Little Dorrit is set.

Most of the prison has been demolished but a wall remains near the Southwark Local Studies Library in Borough High Street. The remaining wall also adjoins the churchyard of St George the Martyr where the fictional Amy (the Little Dorrit of the title) sleeps the night after arriving back late to the Marshalsea, and also where she marries Arthur Clennam. Also close by is The George Inn where Amy's brother Tip adds his request to a begging letter.

Another inmate of the Marshalsea, Mr Plornish, moves with his family to Bleeding Heart Yard, Farringdon, and receives a visit there from Arthur Clennam when he is making inquiries into the Dorrits.
