= Thomas Castle =

British physician and botanist (c.1805–1837)

Thomas Castle (c.1805–1837) was an English botanical and medical writer.

== Life ==
Castle was born in Kent, and after leaving school became a pupil of John Gill, who as surgeon at Hythe; he went on to London to carry on his studies. He entered Guy's Hospital in 1826, and was a member of its Physical Society; in 1827 he was elected fellow of the Linnean Society, when he was living in Bermondsey Square in south London.

Castle matriculated at The Queen's College, Oxford in 1830, and at Trinity College, Cambridge in 1831. Subsequently, he moved to Brighton, and committed suicide in 1837.

== Works ==
Castle's publications were:

- Lexicon Pharmacopœlium, London 1826, 2nd edit., 1834.
- Modern Surgery, 1828.
- Manual of Surgery, ed. by, 2nd edit. 1829, 3rd edit. 1831.
- Systematic and Physiological Botany, 1829.
- Medical Botany, 1829.
- Linnæan System of Botany, 1836.
- Essay on Poisons, 1834, 7th edit. 1845.
- Pharmacopœia, Roy. Coll. Phys., translator, 1837, 2nd edit. 1838.
- Table of Greek Verbs, Cambridge, 1832.

He also edited two editions of James Blundell's Diseases of Women, 1834 and 1837, and with Bernard Herbert Barton published a British Flora Medica, 1837, a second edition of which was edited in 1867 by John Reader Jackson.
