= Tambling (surname) =

Tambling is an English surname. Notable people with the surname include:

- Bobby Tambling (born 1941), English footballer
- Charles Tambling (1871–1958), American college football, college basketball, and college baseball coach
- Christopher Tambling (1964–2015), British composer, organist, and choirmaster
- Grant Tambling (1943–2025), Australian politician
- Jeremy Tambling (born 1948), British writer and critic
- Lola Tambling (born 2008), British skateboarder
- Richard Tambling (born 1986), Australian rules footballer

== See also ==
- Tam Lin, a character in a Scottish ballad
