= The Arzner =

LGBT-friendly cinema in Bermondsey, London

Coordinates: 51.4977°N 0.0807°W

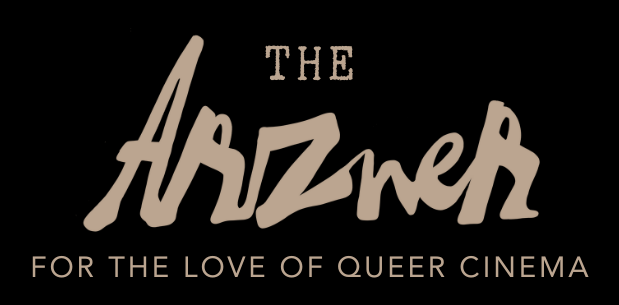
Logo of The Arzner cinema

The Arzner is a dedicated LGBT-friendly independent cinema and bar in Bermondsey Square, London. It was founded by Simon Burke and Piers Greenlees in 2025 with the aim of creating a cinema dedicated to queer cinema. The venue is named after Dorothy Arzner, a lesbian film director who worked in Hollywood in the 1920s through 1940s.

The cinema occupies the premises of the former Kino Bermondsey.

The seventh London Fetish Film Festival is scheduled to be shown at The Arzner in February 2026.
