= Bermondsey Abbey =

English Benedictine monastery

Coordinates: 51°29′51″N 0°4′51″W

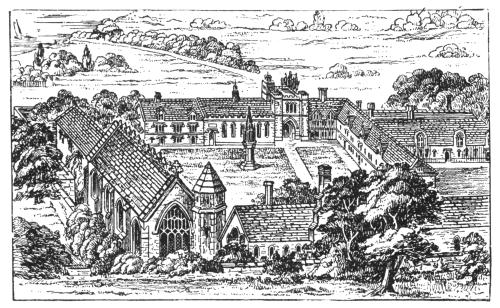
Illustration of Bermondsey Abbey

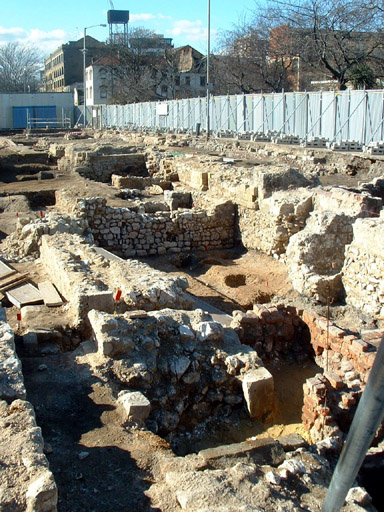
Bermondsey Abbey archaeological dig, viewed from Tower Bridge Road, 5 March 2006

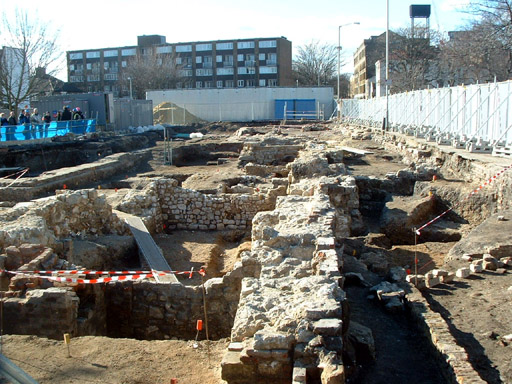
Another view of the archaeological dig from Tower Bridge Road

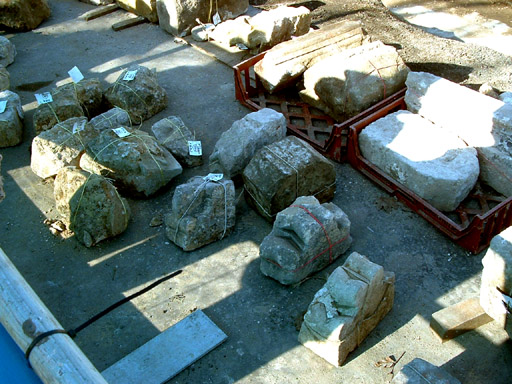
Details of the finds at the archaeological dig

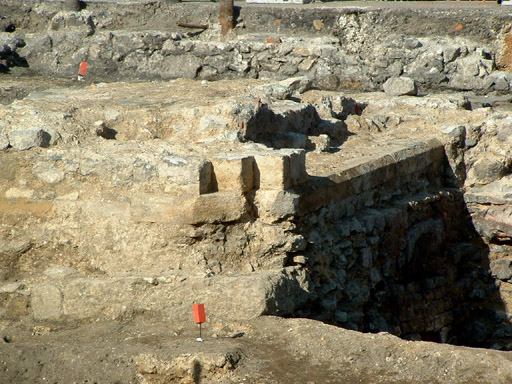
Bermondsey Abbey archaeological dig detailed view

Bermondsey Abbey was an English Benedictine monastery. Although generally regarded as having been founded in the 11th century, it had a precursor mentioned in the early 8th century. It was centred on what is now Bermondsey Square, the site of Bermondsey Market, Bermondsey, in the London Borough of Southwark, southeast London, England.

== Foundation ==
A monastery is known to have existed at Bermondsey before 715 AD, when it was a Surrey colony of the important Mercian monastery of Medeshamstede, later known as Peterborough. Though surviving only in a copy written at Peterborough in the 12th century, a letter of Pope Constantine (708–715) grants privileges to a monastery at Vermundesei. This monastery most likely continued, probably as a secular minster, at least until the 9th-century Viking invasions.

Nothing more is heard of any church at Bermondsey until 1082, when, according to the "Annales Monasterii de Bermundeseia", a monastery was founded there by one Alwinus Child, with royal licence. Given the trend to the continuity of sacred sites, this church most likely was founded on the site of the earlier monastery. This foundation possibly was a direct successor to the church last mentioned in the early 8th century.

Alwinus Child's new monastery, dedicated to St Saviour, is presumably identical with the 'new and handsome church' which appears in the Domesday Book record for Bermondsey, in 1086. In effect, Domesday Book clarifies the "Annales"' mention of royal licence, since it records that the estate of Bermondsey was then held by King William the Conqueror, a small part being also in the hands of Robert, Count of Mortain, the king's half brother, and younger brother of Odo of Bayeux, then earl of Kent. Royal support for the new foundation continued with King William Rufus' gift of the royal estate at Bermondsey, in either 1089 or 1090, and through further grants made, for example, by King Henry I in the 1120s and 1130s. The counts of Mortain maybe also maintained an interest in the new monastery, since Count William of Mortain became a monk there in 1140. Alwinus Child's only recorded gift to the new monastery was 'various rents in the city of London', and these may be represented in Domesday Book by mention of 13 burgesses there paying 44 d annually to the estate at Bermondsey.

The new monastery was established as an alien Cluniac priory through the arrival in 1089 of four monks from St Mary's of La Charité-sur-Loire, apparently at the invitation of Archbishop Lanfranc of Canterbury. These were Peter, Richard, Osbert, and Umbald, with Peter becoming the first prior.

The monks began the development of the marshes surrounding the abbey, cultivating the land and embanking the riverside into a Priory Close spanning 140 acres of meadow and digging dykes. They turned the adjacent tidal inlet at the mouth of the River Neckinger into the priory's dock, and named it St Saviour's Dock, after their abbey. This provided a safe landing for Church dignitaries and goods below the traditional first land crossing, the congested stone arches of London Bridge.

The church remained a Cluniac priory until the late 14th century. In 1380, Richard Dunton, the first English prior, paid a fine of 200 marks (£133 6s 8d) to have the Bermondsey monastery's establishment naturalised: this protected it from actions taken against alien properties in time of war, but it also set the priory on the path to independent status as an abbey, divorced from both La Charité and Cluny, which it achieved in 1390.

Bermondsey itself, however, long remained little more than a high street ribbon (the modern Bermondsey Street), leading from the southern bank of the Thames, at Tooley Street, up to the abbey close. Nearby land was owned by the Knights Templar, and other ecclesiastical properties stood not far away. In the Archbishop of Canterbury's manor of Southwark, wealthy citizens and clerics had their houses, including the priors of Lewes and St Augustine's, Canterbury, and the abbot of Battle. Moreover, in 1353 King Edward III built a manor house close to the Thames in Bermondsey.

== Royal connections ==
At Christmas 1154, the newly crowned King Henry II and his Queen, Eleanor of Aquitaine, held court at Bermondsey Priory. A few weeks later, on 28 February 1155, the royal couple's second child, Prince Henry was born there.

Elizabeth Woodville, the widow of Edward IV, registered as a boarder at the Abbey on 12 February 1487, after retiring from the court of Henry VII, receiving free hospitality as the widow of Edward IV. She died there on 8 June 1492. Her two sons, Edward V and Richard of Shrewsbury, 4th Duke of York, had disappeared in the Tower of London in 1483, and her daughter, Elizabeth of York, had married Henry VII, the first Tudor monarch, in 1486. Mathewe Baker, a courtier to Henry VII and his son Henry VIII, died at Bermondsey Abbey in May 1513 and was buried there "before the Image of St. Saviour in the Chancel" as his Will requests.

=== "King John's Palace" ===
Possibly because of the royal events at Bermondsey, a legend asserted that King John had built a palace there. The 17th-century antiquarian John Aubrey gave credence to this story. However, Richard Rawlinson, editing his Natural History and Antiquities of the County of Surrey in 1719, said: "Mr Aubrey tells us, that he was assured by one Mr Hawkins, that this Abbey of Bermondsey was King John's Palace, and converted into an abbey; but upon what Authority this information was grounded I cannot find." This is a confusion with another royal residence which was much nearer the Thames, but within the manor of Bermondsey owned by the Abbey.

== Burials ==
500 people have been found so far, but there could be up to 750 burials

- Mary of Scotland, Countess of Boulogne
- Ann Echingham, widow of John Tuchet, 6th Baron Audley
- Matthew Baker (governor)
- William, Count of Mortain

These are the notable burials

== Land and estates ==
Bermondsey rapidly acquired a valuable estate, both temporal and spiritual.

In 1103 and 1104 it acquired from Henry I his interest in Southwark to the west of Borough High Street (Stane Street) just to the south of the ancient borough, stretching over to Lambeth and to the south to Walworth. This became known as the King's Manor, Southwark, after its acquisition by the City of London in 1550. In 1122 it was given the church of St George the Martyr; Long Lane led from the Abbey to the High Street by the church to connect the two estates.

In 1291, temporalities (such as landed estates) were valued at almost £229, and spiritualities (such as advowsons) at just over £50. The Valor Ecclesiasticus of 1535 put the abbey's clear annual value at a little over £474.

The estate ranged widely, including properties in Surrey, Leicestershire, Hertfordshire, Buckinghamshire, Gloucestershire, Somerset and Kent.
The manor of Charlton, then in Kent, was given by Bishop Robert Bloet of Lincoln in 1093. In 1268, Bermondsey was granted a Monday market at Charlton, as well as an annual fair of three days, centred on Trinity Sunday, the eighth Sunday after Easter.
Land in Dulwich and elsewhere was given by Henry I in 1127.

== Dissolution ==
At the Dissolution of the Monasteries under Henry VIII, the abbey was forcibly surrendered by the last abbot to the king. Henry granted the property and its lands to Sir Robert Southwell. He in turn sold the buildings to Sir Thomas Pope, founder of Trinity College, Oxford. Pope broke up the abbey, erecting on the property a house that incorporated several of the existing buildings, though others were pulled down. Pope then sold it back to Southwell who later sold it on to a London goldsmith.

Pope himself died of the plague in 1558. The house was later in the hands of Thomas Radclyffe, 3rd Earl of Sussex (c. 1525–1583), a diplomat and leading courtier of Queen Elizabeth I, and he was using it as a residence by 1570, when she visited him there. At the period he was active as Lord President of the North, though in 1572 he became Lord Chamberlain. It seems that during Sussex's time at Bermondsey, some of the buildings on the site were used as a hospital and for general relief. Sussex himself took treatment there in 1575 (aged 50).

== Remains ==
Neither the house nor the Abbey still stand. By 1822, The Morning Post reported that all that remained was "a solitary fragment or two of stone wall, in what is called King John's Court, together with a few old buildings". Houses on nearby Grange Walk also incorporate some of the Abbey's remains. Within the structure of the late 17th-century Grade II-listed houses numbered 5, 6 and 7 is part of one side of the late medieval stone gatehouse. At number 7 is the chamfered south jamb of the gateway with two wrought-iron gate-hooks projecting from the wall and a 'Gatehouse' sign. The remains of the south-western tower of the abbey church can be seen below the glass floor of the Del'Aziz restaurant and bar on Bermondsey Square.

In 1904, during construction in Abbey Street, two stone coffins with human remains were found ten feet below the ground with six more burials, without coffins, above them and close by. Parts of the Abbey's foundations were also unearthed. In 1932, the consecration stone of the Abbey was discovered by a workman at a petrol station in Tower Bridge Road, where it had been placed in the foundations of a later building.

== Archaeology ==
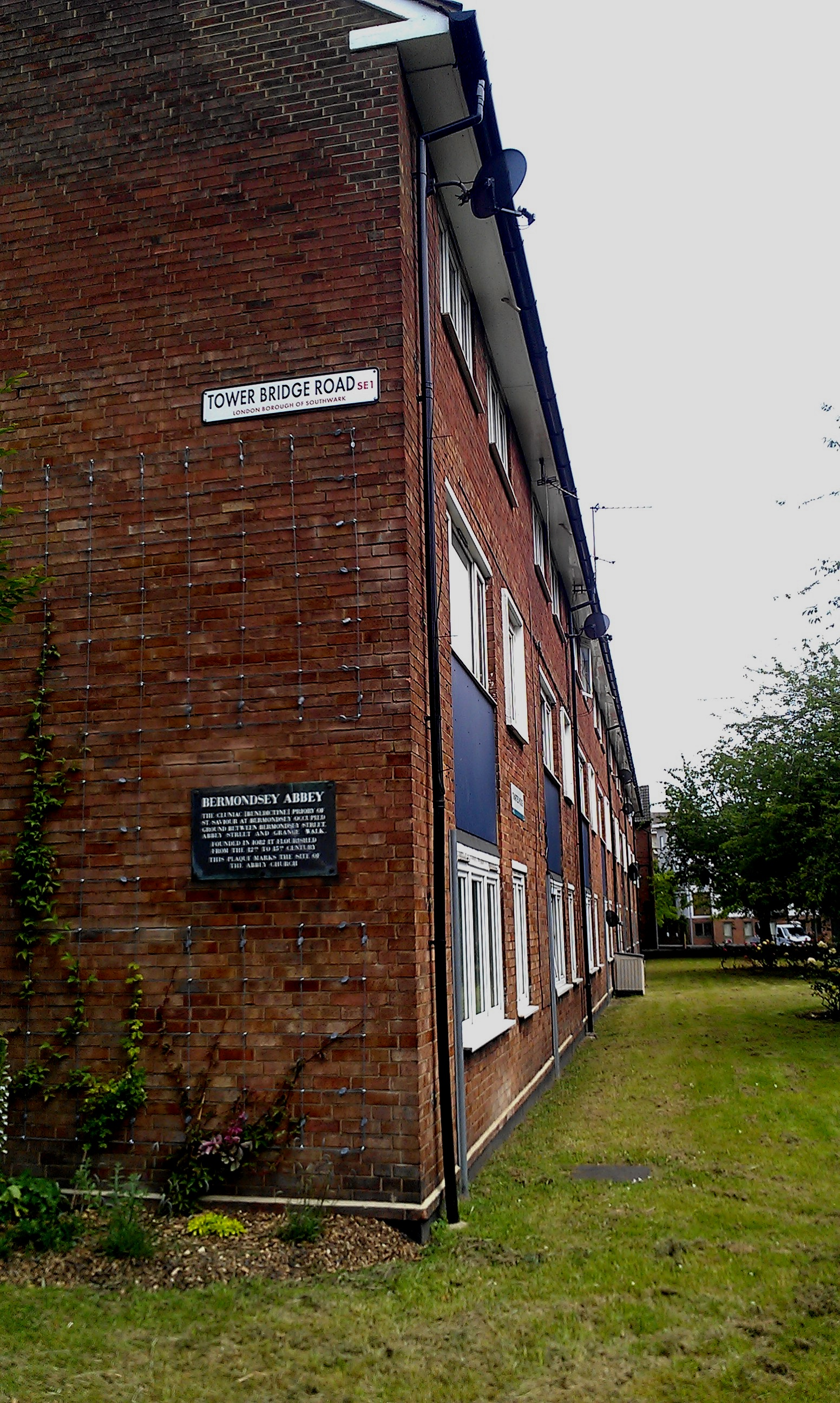
Housing block featuring a plaque highlighting the location of the abbey church

The site at Bermondsey Square has been extensively redeveloped with archaeological excavations undertaken in 2005–6 by English Heritage. It provided PCA an opportunity to undertake a number of excavations on the site along Abbey Street, most recently in early 2006. Another part of the site is to be excavated along Tower Bridge Road.

== See also ==
- The Bermondsey Lion
