= Jeremy Tambling =

British writer and critic

Jeremy Tambling is a British writer and critic. He was Professor of Comparative Literature at the University of Hong Kong until 2006 and then Professor of Literature at the University of Manchester until December 2013. His most recent position is Professor of English at the University of Social Sciences and Humanities, Warsaw (2019).

He has won a number of awards for his scholarship including research grants for his work on Blake, Dante, and Henry James and is a recurring face on the conference scene; four times on Dickens in 2012.

Tambling’s literary interests range from Boccaccio to Kafka, Chaucer to Cinema. More specifically he has published books on Blake, Dickens and the nineteenth-century and cities within literature.

== Education and teaching ==
Jeremy Tambling spent much of his youth in South-East London, at Dulwich College. He received his Bachelor of Arts (BA) from the University of York in 1969, where a major influence was Dr F.R. Leavis. He completed his M.Phil at the University of Nottingham in "The Intellectual and Cultural Milieu of Dickens’s Novels" in 1973, and his PhD at Essex University in "Vo significando: The Heuristic Art of Dante’s Commedia" in 1985.

Tambling has a broad background in teaching ranging from Comprehensive Schools in England to lecturing, and then Professorship in Comparative Literature, at the University of Hong Kong, a position he held for over 18 years. He is interested in education at all levels, is a prison-visitor, and likes critical approaches which question disciplinary limits in the humanities and social sciences.

== Published work ==
Tambling has produced many articles and written many books. His article Prison-bound: Dickens and Foucault (1986) explored Dickens’s interest in the penal system and also developed the concept of the ‘docile body’. It was published in four collections of Dickens criticism.

His expertise ranges from Dante to Dickens, Anachronism to Allegory and Nietzsche to Nihilism. His interest in Literary Theory is extensive; main areas of focus include: Marxist theory, Nietzsche and modernity, Freud, and gender and sexuality. Current research includes work on cities in literature and a history of the Devil; with reference to Freud, Blake and Dostoevsky.

== Publications (single authorship) ==
1. Opera, Ideology and Film (Manchester: Manchester University Press 1987).
2. Dante and Difference: Writing in the Commedia (Cambridge: C.U.P. 1988) An excerpt was reprinted in the anthology "Classical and medieval Criticism published Gale Research Press, 1989, in their "Literary Criticism" series.]
3. What is Literary Language? (Milton Keynes: Open University Press 1988).
4. Confession: Sexuality, Sin, the Subject (Manchester University Press 1990).
5. Narrative and Ideology (Milton Keynes: Open University Press 1991).
6. Dickens, Violence and the Modern State: Dreams of the Scaffold (London: Macmillan, 1995) 7 Versions of two chapters from this appeared in Essays in Criticism: one chapter, on Great Expectations, has been reprinted in four separate anthologies of Dickens criticism: by editors Roger Sell; Steven Connor; Michael Cotsell; Michael Hollington.
7. Opera and the Culture of Fascism (Oxford: Clarendon Press 1996).
8. Henry James: Critical Issues (London: Macmillan, 2000).
9. Lost in the American City: Dickens, James and Kafka (New York: Palgrave, 2001).
10. Becoming Posthumous (Edinburgh University Press 2001).
11. Wong Kar-wai's Happy Together (Hong Kong: Hong Kong University Press 2003).
12. Allegory and the Work of Melancholy: The Late Medieval and Shakespeare (Amsterdam: Rodopi 2004).
13. Blake's Night Thoughts (London: Palgrave/Macmillan 2004).
14. Madmen and Other Survivors: Reading Lu Xun’s Fiction (Hong Kong: Hong Kong University Press, January 2007).
15. Re-Verse: Turning Towards Poetry (London: Longman, 2007).
16. Going Astray: Dickens and London (London: Longman 2008).
17. (With Louis Lo): Walking Macao: Reading the Baroque (Hong Kong: Hong University Press 2009).
18. Allegory (the New Critical Idiom) (London: Routledge 2009).
19. On Anachronism (Manchester: Manchester University Press 2010).
20. Dante in Purgatory: States of Affect (Turnhout: Brepols 2010).
21. On Reading the Will: Law and Desire in Literature and Music (Brighton: Sussex Academic Press 2012).
22. Literature and Psychoanalysis (Manchester: Manchester University Press 2013).
23. Hölderlin and the Poetry of Tragedy: Readings in Sophocles, Shakespeare, Nietzsche and Benjamin (Sussex Academic Press 2014)
24. The Palgrave Handbook to Literature and the City. ed. Jeremy Tambling (London: Palgrave 2017).
25. Dickens' Novels as Poetry: Allegory and Literature in the City (Routledge 2014).
26. Histories of the Devil: From Marlowe to Mann and the Manichees. Palgrave Macmillan. 2017. ISBN 978-1137518316.
27. Dickens, Nicholas Nickleby, and the Dance of Death (London: Routledge, 2019).
1. The Poetry of Dante's Paradiso: Lives Almost Divine, Spirits that Matter. (London: Palgrave, 2021).
2. The Death Penalty in Dickens and Derrida (London: Bloomsbury, 2023).
