= Rookery (slum) =

Colloquial English term referring to a city slum

A rookery, in the colloquial English of the eighteenth and nineteenth centuries, was a city slum occupied by poor people and frequently also by criminals and prostitutes. Such areas were overcrowded, with low-quality housing and little or no sanitation. Local industry such as coal plants and gasholders polluted the rookery air. Poorly constructed dwellings, built with multiple storeys and often crammed into any area of open ground, created densely populated areas of gloomy, narrow streets and alleyways. By many, these parts of the city were sometimes deemed "uninhabitable". Local trades such as fulling and tanning, cat's meat, and livestock added to the unsanitary conditions. In addition brick pits where clay had been excavated sometimes remained and these filled with surface water, sewage and rubbish.

== Etymology ==
The term rookery originated because of the perceived similarities between a city slum and the nesting habits of the rook, a bird in the crow family. Rooks nest in large, noisy colonies consisting of multiple nests, often untidily crammed into a close group of treetops called a rookery.

The word might also be linked to the slang expression to rook (meaning to cheat or steal), a verb well established in the 16th century and associated with the supposedly thieving nature of the rook bird. The term rookery was first used in print by the poet George Galloway in 1792 to describe "a cluster of mean tenements densely populated by people of the lowest class".

== Creation of a rookery ==
An area might become a rookery when criminals would inhabit dead-end streets for their strategic use in isolation. In other cases, industry that produced noise or odours would drive away inhabitants that would not settle for such an environment and could leave. These types of industry could be "some foul factory, a gas-works, the debris of a street market, or an open sewer", which often employed those who lived within the rookery. Another factor which created rookeries was the lack of building regulations, or at times the ignorance of such by construction workers. Middle-class houses were too large (expensive) for single working-class families, so they were often sub-divided to accommodate multiple households – a factor which ran these homes into noise and ruin.

== Rookery inhabitants ==
The people living in a rookery were often migrants, immigrants, poor and working-class or criminals. Notable groups of immigrants who inhabited rookeries were Jewish and Irish. The jobs available to rookery occupants were undesirable jobs such as rag-picking, street sweeping, or waste removal.

== London rookeries ==
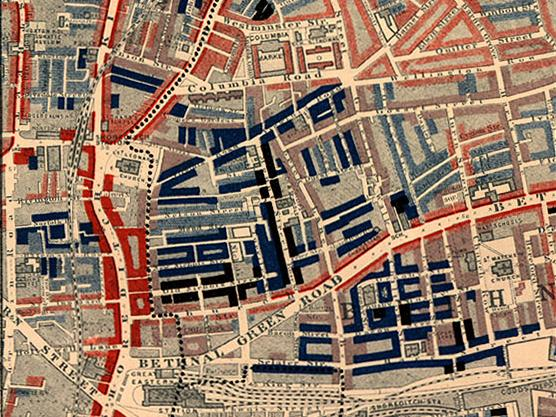
Part of Charles Booth's poverty map showing the Old Nichol in the East End of London. Published in 1889 in Life and Labour of the People in London. The red areas are "middle class, well-to-do", light blue areas are "poor, 18s to 21s a week for a moderate family", dark blue areas are "very poor, casual [employment], chronic want", and black areas are the "lowest class ... occasional labourers, street sellers, loafers, criminals and semi-criminals".

Famous rookeries include the St Giles area of central London, which existed from the 17th century and into Victorian times; this area was described by Henry Mayhew in about 1860 in A Visit to the Rookery of St Giles and its Neighbourhood. The St Giles slum, Jacob's Island in Bermondsey, and the Old Nichol Street rookery in the East End of London were demolished as part of London slum clearance and urban redevelopment projects in the late 19th century.

In 1850, the English novelist Charles Dickens was given a guided tour of several dangerous rookeries by "Inspector Field, the formidable chief detective of Scotland Yard". A party of six – Dickens, Field, an assistant commissioner, and three lower ranks (probably armed) – made their way into the Rat's Castle, backed by a squad of local police within whistling distance. The excursion started in the evening and lasted until dawn. They went through St Giles and even worse slums, in the Old Mint, along the Ratcliffe Highway and Petticoat Lane. The results of this and other investigations came out in novels, short stories, and straight journalism, of which Dickens wrote a great deal.

Oliver Twist (1838) features the rookery at Jacob's Island:

... crazy wooden galleries common to the backs of half a dozen houses, with holes from which to look upon the slime beneath; windows, broken and patched, with poles thrust out, on which to dry the linen that is never there; rooms so small, so filthy, so confined, that the air would seem to be too tainted even for the dirt and squalor which they shelter; wooden chambers thrusting themselves out above the mud and threatening to fall into it—as some have done; dirt-besmeared walls and decaying foundations, every repulsive lineament of poverty, every loathsome indication of filth, rot, and garbage: all these ornament the banks of Folly Ditch.

In Sketches by Boz, Dickens described a rookery:

Wretched houses with broken windows patched with rags and paper: every room let out to a different family, and in many instances to two or even three ... filth everywhere—a gutter before the houses and a drain behind—clothes drying and slops emptying, from the windows; girls of fourteen or fifteen, with matted hair, walking about barefoot, and in white great-coats, almost their only covering; boys of all ages, in coats of all sizes and no coats at all; men and women, in every variety of scanty and dirty apparel, lounging, scolding, drinking, smoking, squabbling, fighting, and swearing.

In The Rookeries of London (1850) Thomas Beames also described one:

The Rookery ... was like an honeycomb, perforated by a number of courts and blind alleys, cul de sac, without any outlet other than the entrance. Here were the lowest lodging houses in London, inhabited by the various classes of thieves common to large cities … were banded together. … Because all are taken in who can pay their footing, the thief and the prostitute are harboured among those whose only crime is poverty, and there is thus always a comparatively secure retreat for him who has outraged his country's laws. Sums here are paid, a tithe of which, if well laid out, would provide at once a decent and an ample lodging for the deserving poor; and that surplus, which might add to the comfort and better the condition of the industrious, finds its way into the pocket of the middleman ...

Kellow Chesney gives a whole chapter to the rookeries of London. At their zenith they were a problem that seemed impossible to solve, yet eventually they did decline. Changes in the law, the growing effectiveness of the police, slum clearances, and perhaps the growing prosperity of the economy gradually had their effect.

== Other rookeries ==
The King Street Rookery in Southampton was also notorious during the early nineteenth century.

The term has also been used in other parts of the English-speaking world, including the United States and Australia.

== See also ==
- The dictionary definition of rookery at Wiktionary
