= St Saviour's Dock =

Dock in London, England

Coordinates: 51.5022°N 0.0710°W

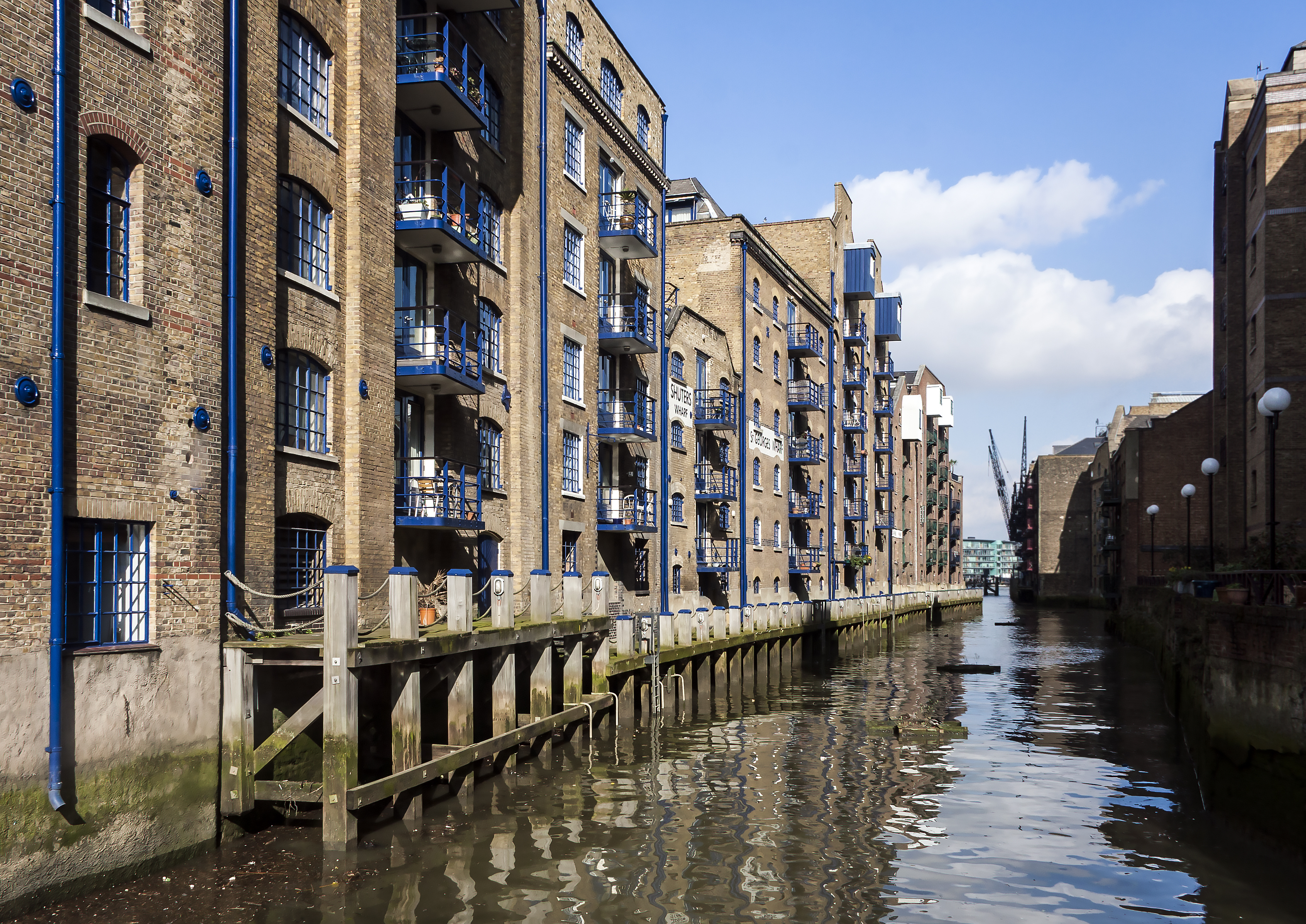
St Saviour's Dock (View North to Thames)

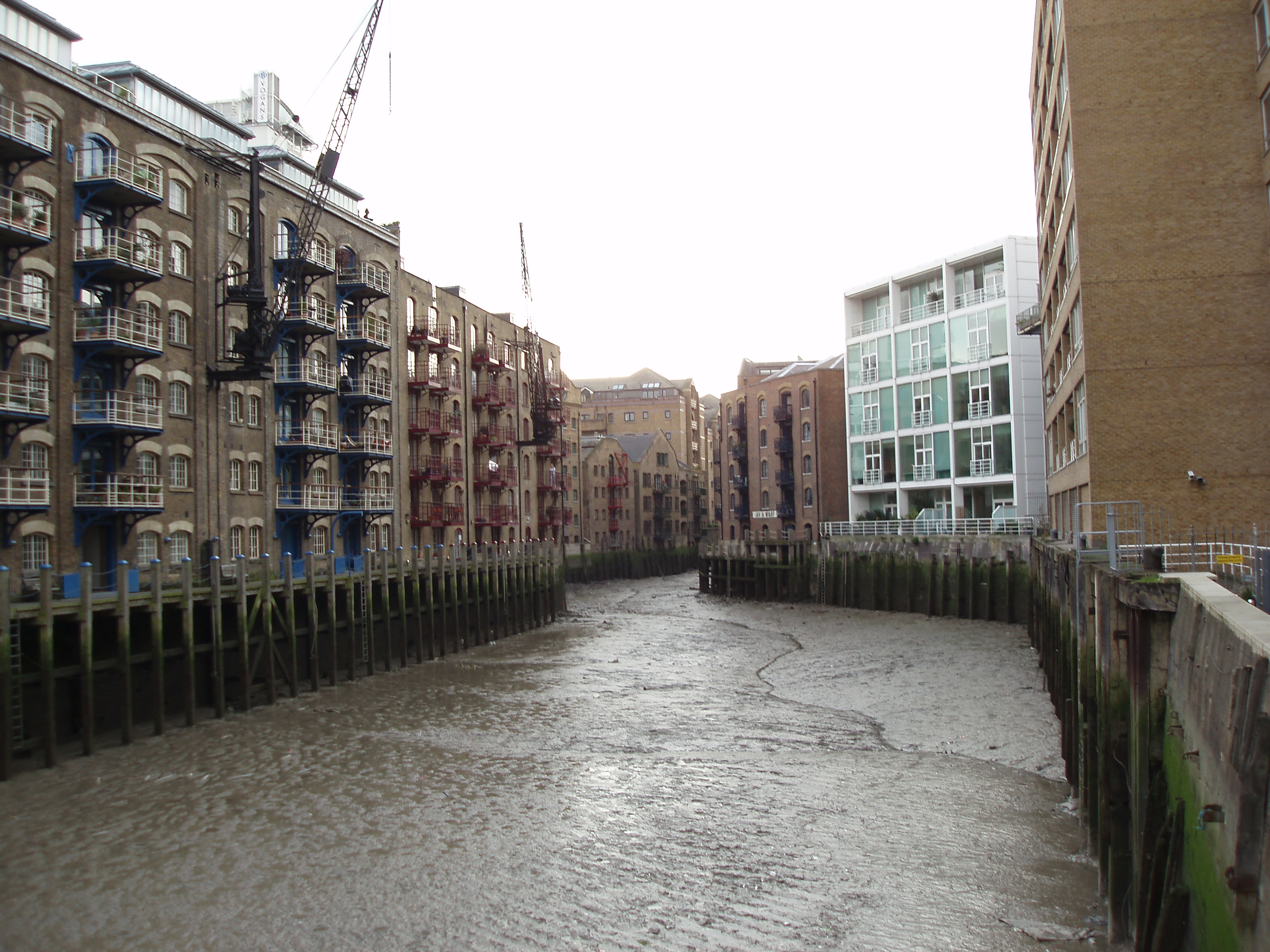
View Southeast into dock

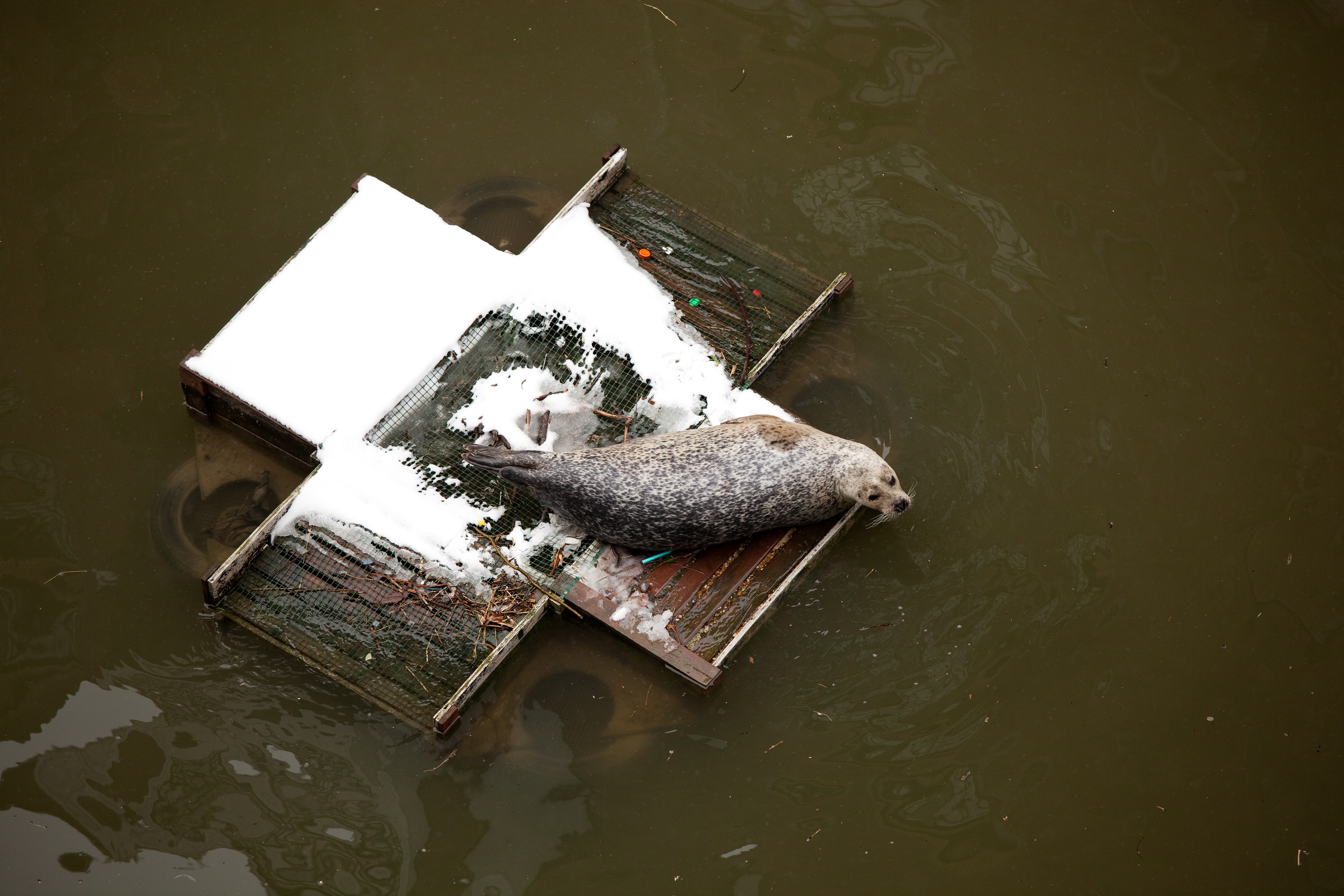
Seal on bird feeding platform

St Saviour's Dock is an inlet-style dock in London, England, on the south bank of the River Thames, 420 metres east of Tower Bridge. It forms the eastern end of the Shad Thames embankment that starts at Tower Bridge. The east side of the Dock is Jacob's Island.

== Geography ==
The Thames is highly tidal at this point and the intertidal range within the inlet is substantial, with a rise and fall of four metres since the construction of a system of winter flow-regulating locks and weirs on the River Thames culminating in Teddington Lock and of the Thames Barrier. During tidal surges the water level has risen just above pavement level of adjacent buildings on Shad Thames and Mill Street. The rectangular inlet opens to the river 420 metres east of Tower Bridge.

is the point where the River Neckinger enters the Thames. The Neckinger is a subterranean river that rises in the south of Southwark, near Walworth and flows to the Thames underground.

== History ==
A community of Cluniac monks resided at Bermondsey Abbey south-east of the site from 1082 onwards. The community began the development of the marshes surrounding their abbey at Bermondsey, cultivating the land and embanking the riverside into a Priory Close spanning 140 acres of meadow and digging dykes. They turned the adjacent tidal inlet at the mouth of the River Neckinger into the priory's dock, and named it Saint Saviour's Dock after their abbey's patron. This provided a safe landing for Bishops and goods below the traditional first land crossing, the congested stone arches of London Bridge. According to the Winchester Episcopal Register, the Bishop of Winchester when returning from abroad was expected to land at Bermondsey shores.

John Stow, a 16th-century English historian and antiquarian had the following to say about the area,

"In the south end whereof (Note: Whereof means of which) was sometime a priory or abbey of St. Saviour, called Bermond's Eye (Note: Pronounced /eɪ/ as in its extended form eyot which is also commonly spelt ait.) in Southwark, founded by Alwin Childe, a citizen of London, in the year 1081."

== In popular culture ==
Charles Dickens set portions of his novel Oliver Twist in the area of Shad Thames, at a time when it was an area of notorious poverty known as Jacob's Island. He set Bill Sikes's den at the east of Shad Thames in buildings adjacent to St Saviour's Dock. It is here that Sykes falls from a roof and dies in the mud, probably of St Saviour's Dock. St Saviour's Dock was featured in the 2002 video game The Getaway, serving as the final area in the game for both characters' campaigns - however the area is inaccurately portrayed as more modern industrial dock, large enough to moor a cargo ship and bearing almost no resemblance to the real area. St Saviour's Dock is also featured as a more faithful recreation in the 2020 video game Watch Dogs: Legion, depicted as 'Butler's Wharf Houseboats'.
