= River Neckinger =

Subterranean river in London, United Kingdom

Coordinates: 51°30′02″N 0°04′24″W

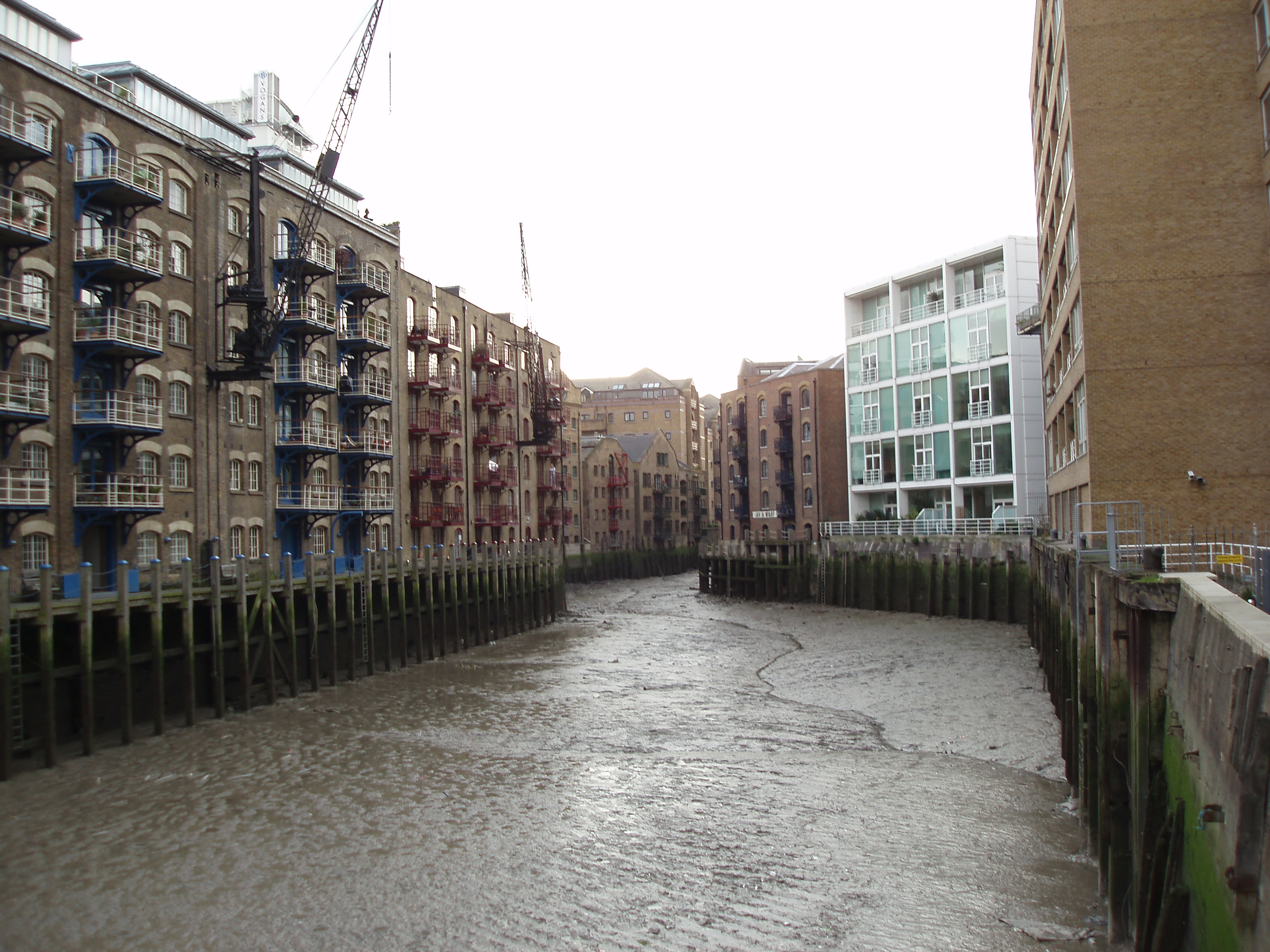
St Saviour's Dock is a deep-excavated and embanked inlet where the vestiges of the Neckinger meet the River Thames. Here the inlet divides the riverside districts of Shad Thames and Jacob's Island.

The River Neckinger is a reduced subterranean river that rises in Southwark and flows approximately 2.5 kilometres (1.6 miles) through south London to St Saviour's Dock where it enters the Thames. What remains of the river is enclosed and runs underground and most of its narrow catchment has been diverted into other combined and surface water sewers, flowing into the Southern Outfall Sewer and the Thames, respectively.

== Course ==
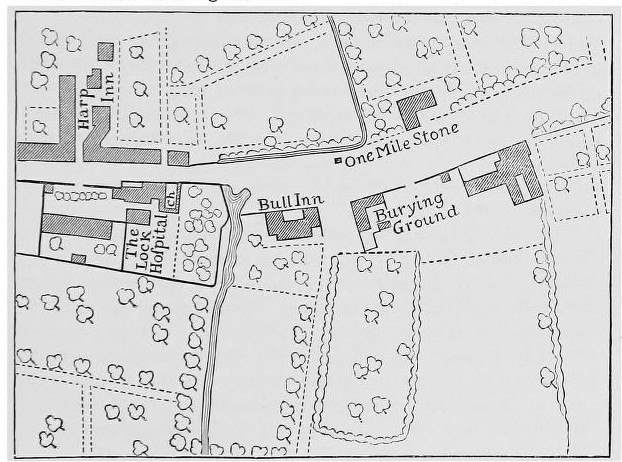
19th century map showing the Lock Stream (between the Lock Hospital and Bull Inn) going under the Old Kent Road then reappearing as a channel on the other side.

The watercourse drained first the seasonally wet (and occasionally flooded) ground at St George's Fields, where the former building of the Bethlem Royal Hospital, now the Imperial War Museum, stands. Geraldine Mary Harmsworth Park, in western Southwark. Its course was east as follows: it took the line of Brook Drive then passed by the Elephant and Castle, then passed the site of Lock Hospital, Kent Street. This upper section was also known before that hospital's closure in the early 19th century as the Lock Stream. It then runs under Abbey Street and passed the grounds of (since ruined and underground) Bermondsey Abbey to the south, forming the channel north of what was the large Thames island of Bermond's ey (island). The channel is today resembled by Abbey Street. In the first millennium, the river merged into the Thames by hooking north at three points. At least three tidally broadly flooded mouths existed, two of which were west of the former small island of Horsleydown and the third at the approximate site of St Saviour's Dock. The Neckinger's northern mouth (now a surface water point of discharge into a deep, excavated inlet) divides the much built-up former marshland at the east end of Horsleydown island, known as Shad Thames and the low part of Bermondsey historically known as Jacob's Island to the east, which has also been built-up.

== History ==
=== Etymology ===
In the 17th century convicted pirates were hanged at the wharf where the Neckinger entered the Thames. The name of the river is believed to derive from the term "devil's neckcloth", a slang term for the hangman's noose. In London Past and Present, published in 1891, Henry B. Wheatley argued that there was 'much good evidence' that 'the 'Devil's Neckinger'... the ancient place of punishment and execution' was at the site of the 'Dead Tree public-house' on Jacob's Island. Writing in The Inns of Old Southwark And Their Associations, in 1888, authors William Rendle and Philip Norman note that a place called Devol's Neckenger appears on a map in 1740 and, in the same location, in 1813, the Dead Tree inn.

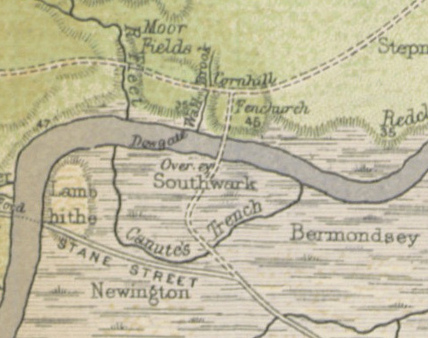
Route of Canute's Trench south of the River Thames from A History of London (1884) by W. J. Loftie. The early section of the Neckinger, where it crossed the Kent Road, was known by this name.

=== Canute's Trench ===
Historian Walter Besant says the Neckinger's early section, where it crosses what is now the New Kent Road, at Lock Bridge, was also known as Canute's Trench. In May, 1016, Danish Cnut the Great, who had invaded England, dug a trench through Southwark to allow his boats to avoid the heavily defended London Bridge. In 1173, a channel following a similar course was used to drain the Thames to allowing building work on London Bridge.

=== Middle Ages ===
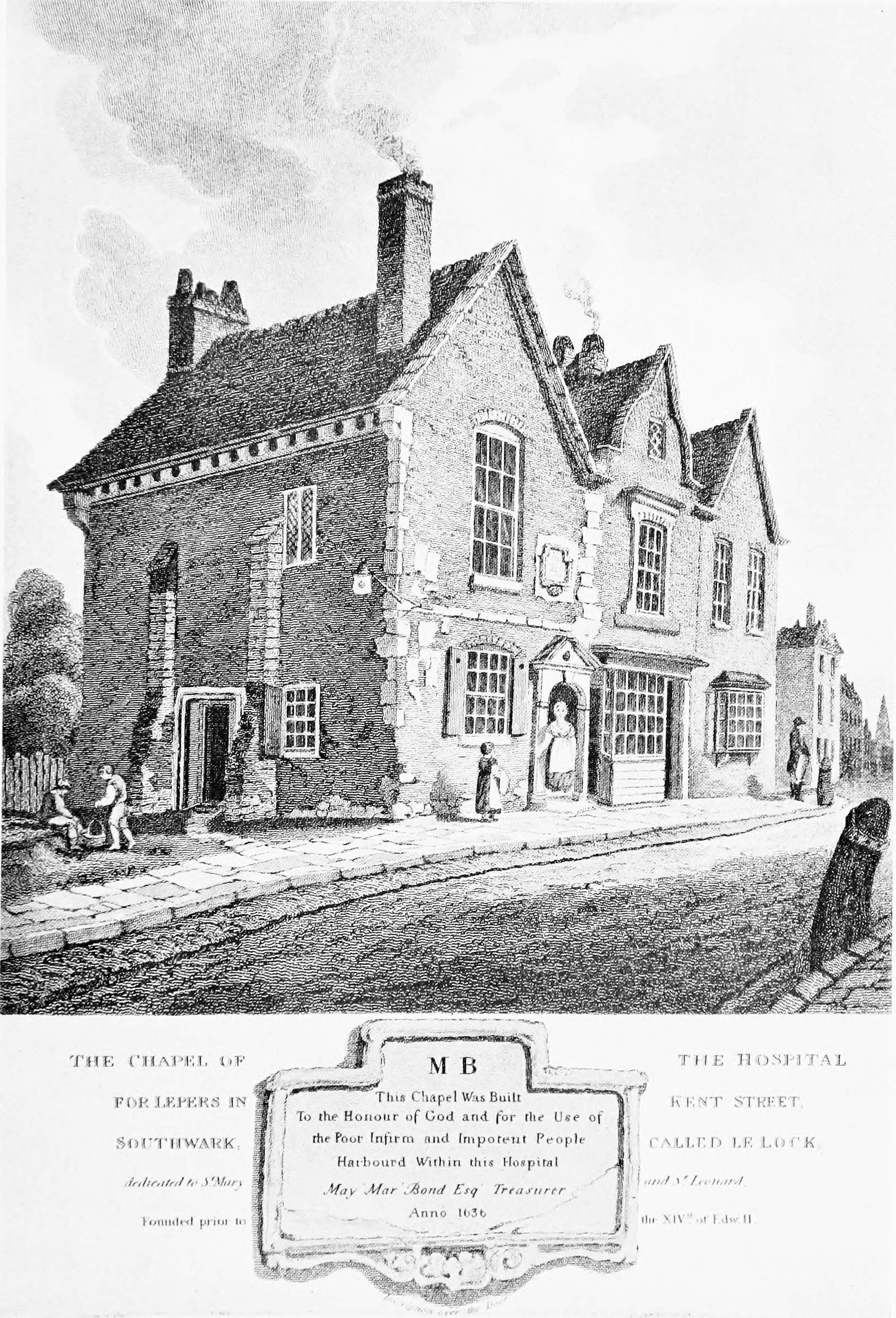
1813 engraving of Chapel of the Hospital for Lepers in Kent Street, Southwark, called Le Lock. The upper section of the Neckinger passed by the hospital site and was known as Lock Stream.

During the Middle Ages, the local religious house, Bermondsey Abbey, made use of the water of the Neckinger to power a tide mill. The mill's early name was Redriff, also an early name for the present neighbouring district of Rotherhithe, On 31 June 1536, the Abbey leased the mill to John Curlew, but the Dissolution of the Monasteries saw it privately acquired. At this time the Neckinger was navigable from the Thames up to the Abbey grounds.

In the 16th century, herbalist and botanist John Gerard wrote of the wild willow herb that 'It is found ... on a Thames bank near to the Devil's Neckerchief on the way to Redriffe.'

=== 17th and 18th centuries ===
In 1640, the City of London issued an order to 'make up and amend' the Lock Bridge as part of sewer works. According to Rendle the sewers were built up to adjoin the bridge at each side and it was a familiar landmark to 'sewer people' in the tunnels. During the 19th century improvements 'the ancient relic was not injured by the new works but necessarily covered up again.

Private homes and businesses began to be built on the former Abbey grounds and the water of the Neckinger attracted tanners to its banks. In the late 1700s competition for the water led to the tanners bringing a suit against the mill owner which was won on the argument of 'ancient usages of the district' which ensured the inhabitants had the right to a supply of tidal water.

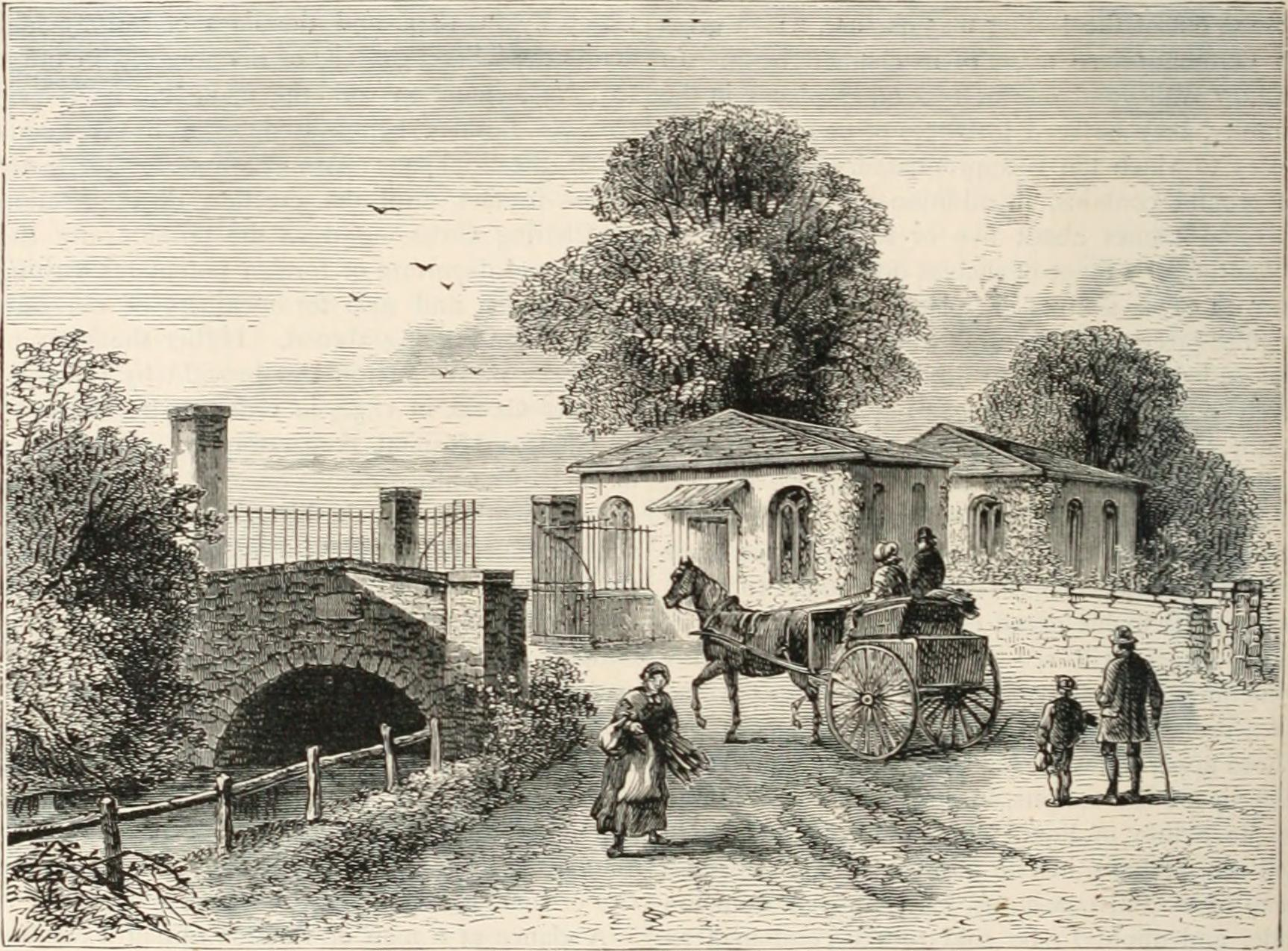
1820 engraving of the bridge and turnpike of Grange Road (now Grange Walk) over the River Neckinger.

The Jacob's Island district was notoriously squalid from early Victorian times until the mid-20th century. It was described by Charles Dickens in 1838 as "the filthiest, the strangest, the most extraordinary of the many localities that are hidden in London", and by the Morning Chronicle in 1849 as "The very capital of cholera" and "The Venice of drains". In Dickens' novel, Oliver Twist, a branch of the Neckinger is given the name Folly Ditch and is the place where the book's Bill Sikes meets his death.

In the 1790s Neckinger Mill was established to produce paper, which continued until 1805 when the site was sold to the leather manufacturers Bevingtons. In 1838, the construction of a new line for the London and Greenwich Railway divided the mill land into two uneven portions, with further railway works taking place in 1841 and 1850.

=== Modern era ===
In 1935, Bevingtons moved most of their business to Dartford, keeping the smaller section of their divided site as a warehouse, and selling the larger portion to the Bermondsey Borough Council. When Bevingtons sold the warehouse in early 1980s it was converted into a residential development, and it has since been joined by new blocks of flats, which coexist, with some friction, with the more bohemian houseboats moored offshore at Reed Wharf.

== See also ==
- Tributaries of the River Thames
- Subterranean rivers of London
- List of rivers in England

Next confluence upstream	River Thames	Next confluence downstream
River Walbrook (north)	River Neckinger	Regent's Canal (north)
