= Butler's Wharf =

Historic building in London, England

Coordinates: 51.5038°N 0.0741°W

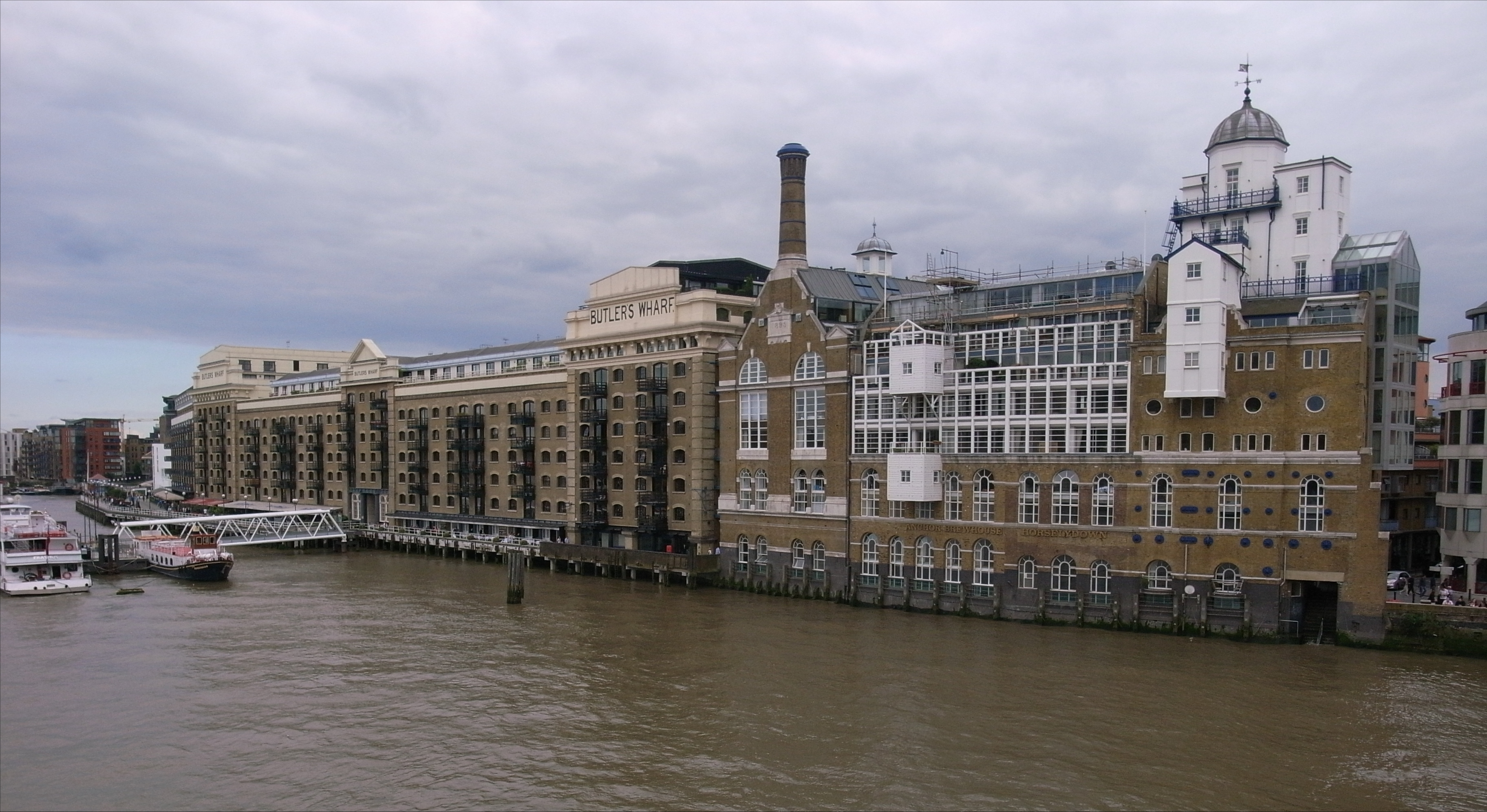
Butler's Wharf from Tower Bridge

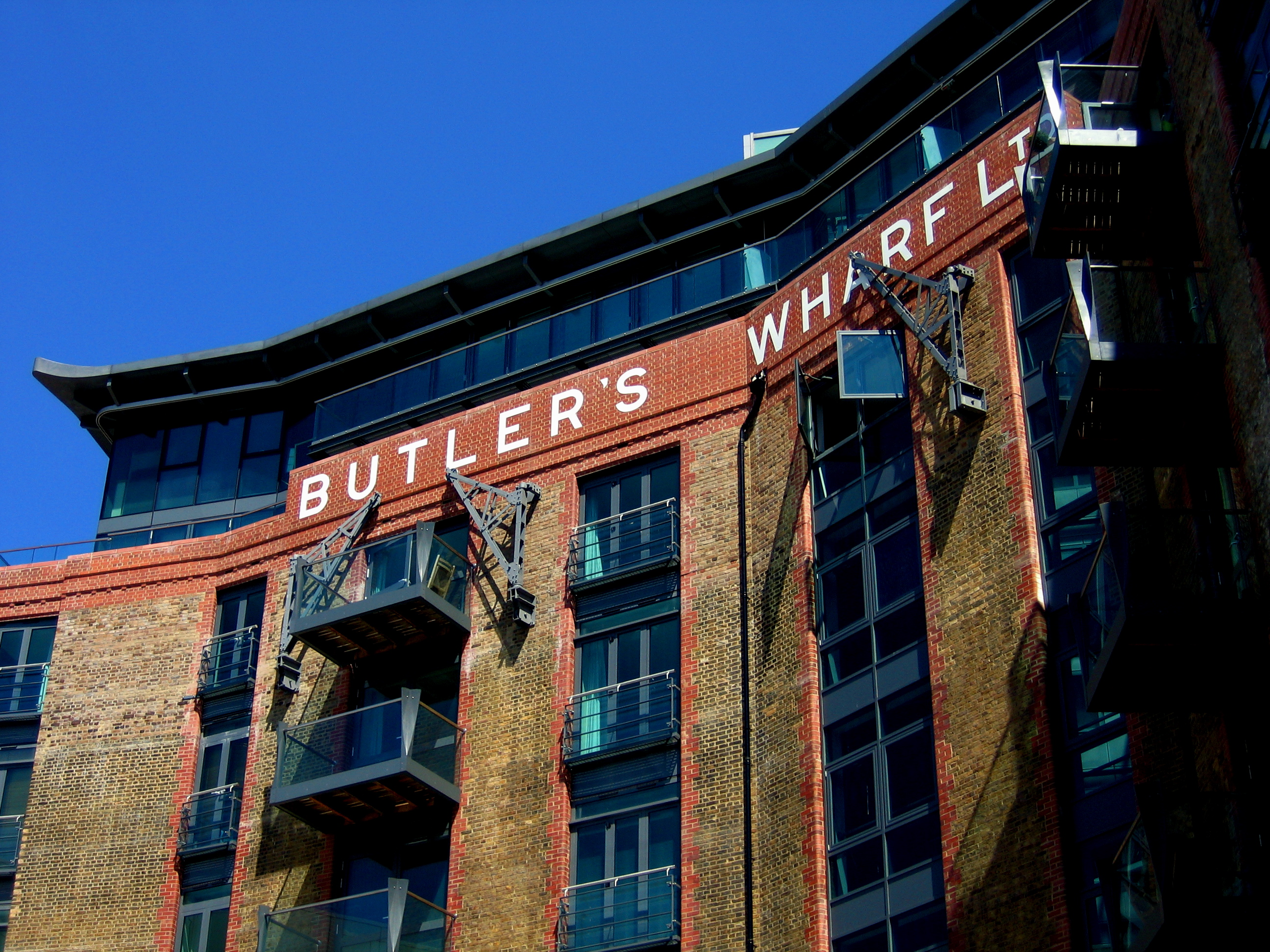
Tea Trade Wharf, an adjacent building in the Shad Thames area

Butler's Wharf is an English historic building at Shad Thames on the south bank of the River Thames, just east of London's Tower Bridge, now housing luxury flats and restaurants. Lying between Shad Thames and the Thames Path, it overlooks both the bridge and St Katharine Docks on the north side of the river. Butler's Wharf is also used as a term for the surrounding area. It is a Grade II listed building.

== History ==
Butler's Wharf, which was designed by James Tolley and Daniel Dale as a shipping wharf and warehouse complex, accommodating goods unloaded from ships using the port of London, was completed in 1873.

From 1975 to 1978, the artists' space at 2B Butler's Wharf was a key venue for early UK video art and performance art, including Kevin Atherton, Stephen Partridge, and later, among others by Derek Jarman and the artists and dancers of X6 Dance Collective who published a magazine called New Dance for a number of years. Some of these people subsequently founded Chisenhale Studios and Chisenhale Dance Space, including Philip Jeck. In 1978, the band X-Ray Spex filmed their video for the song "Identity" in and on the roof of the building.

After the building fell into a state of disuse and then dereliction, Butler's Wharf was transformed into luxury flats, with restaurants and shops on the ground floor. The conversion of the main building, now known as 34 Shad Thames, which was carried out to a design by Conran Roche, was completed in 1989.

The conversion of the Clove Building, which was carried out by Sir Robert McAlpine to a design by Allies and Morrison, was completed in 1990 and the conversion of Tea Trade Wharf, which was carried out by Carillion to a design by OSEL Architecture, was completed in 2003.

== In popular culture ==
Butler's Wharf was used twice as a filming location for Doctor Who, for the episode "World's End" in the serial The Dalek Invasion of Earth (1964) and for the serial Resurrection of the Daleks (1984), which prominently featured Butler's Wharf and the portion of Shad Thames running behind it.
