= Grange Walk =

Road in London

Coordinates: 51.49678°N 0.07618°W

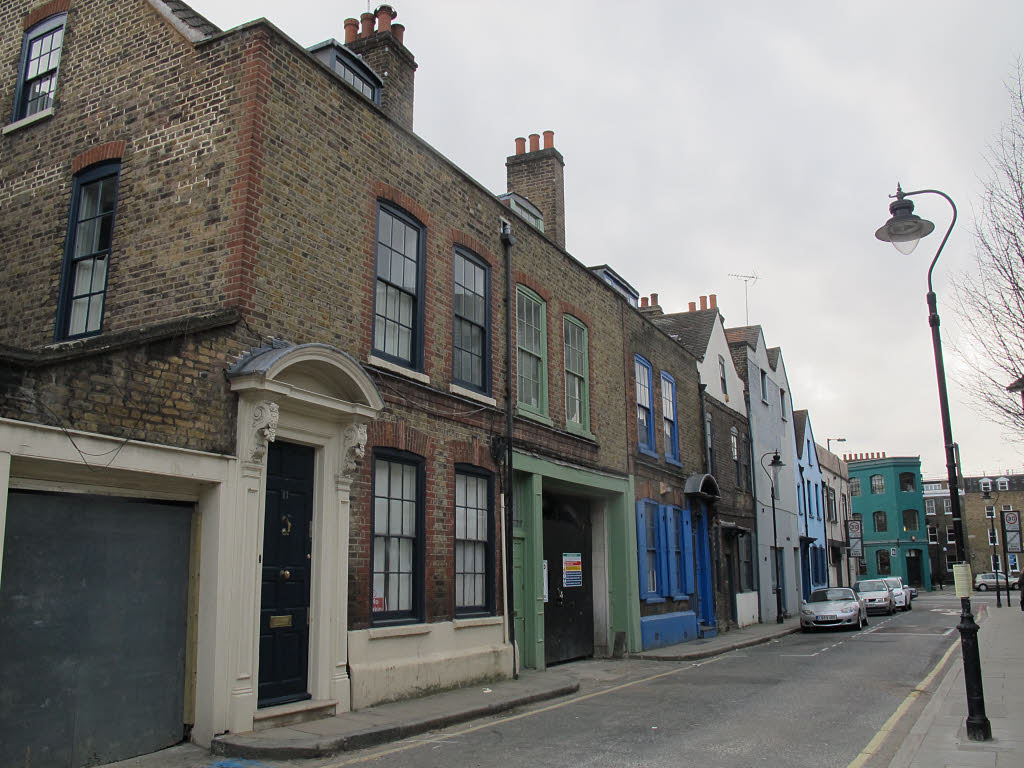
- Grange Walk in 2015.
- West end: Tower Bridge Road
- East end: Neckinger

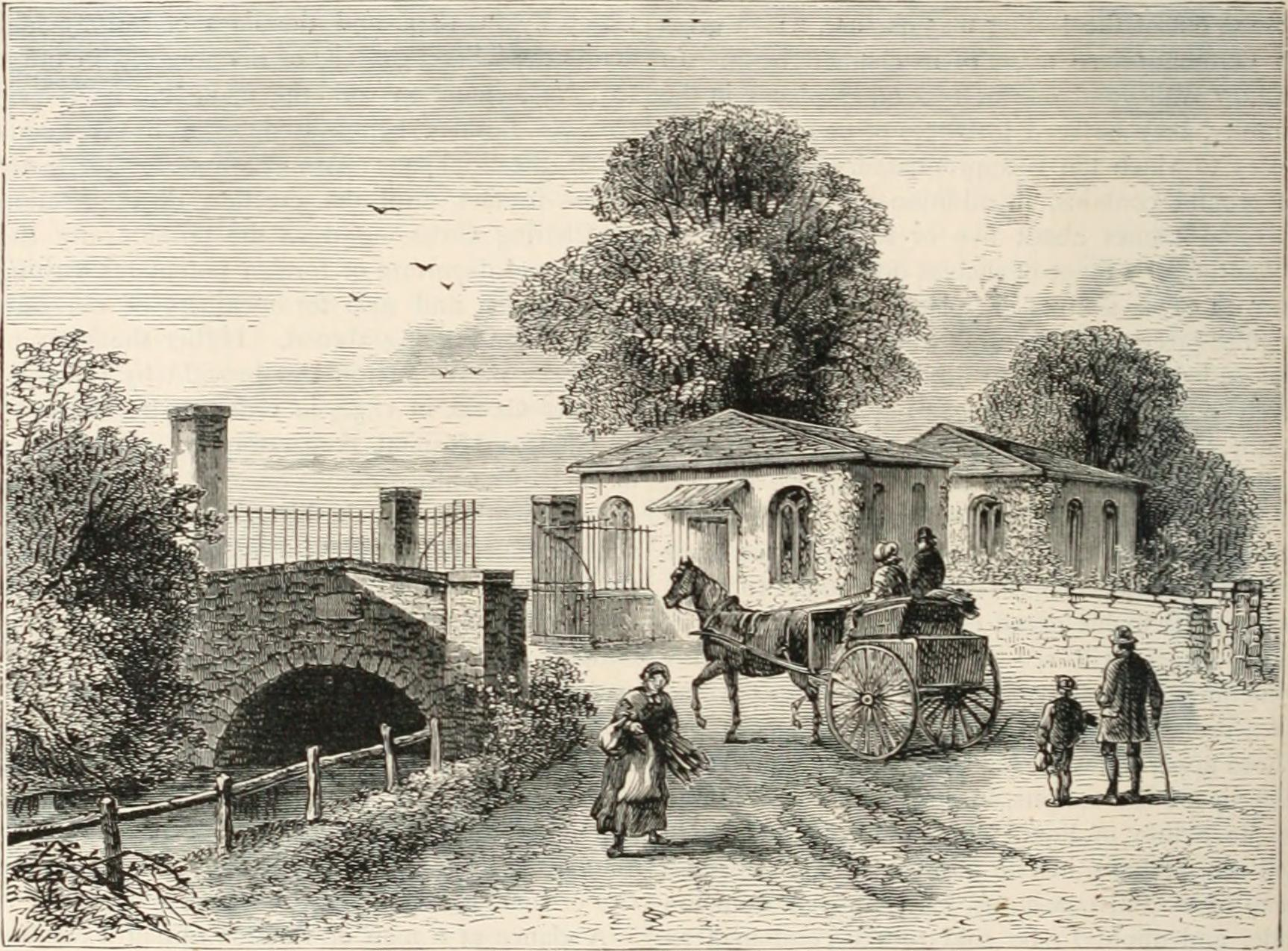
1820 engraving of Grange Walk (then Road), and the bridge and turnpike over the River Neckinger.

Grange Walk is a historic road in Bermondsey in the London Borough of Southwark, in south London. It runs between Tower Bridge Road in the west and Neckinger in the east.

== History ==
Described as one of the prettiest roads in Bermondsey it contains numerous historic buildings and has associations with the demolished Bermondsey Abbey, which is perhaps most famous for being the last residence of Queen Elizabeth Woodville, mother of the "Princes in the Tower" and Elizabeth of York.

Within the structure of the late 17th-century Grade II-listed houses numbered 5, 6 and 7 is part of one side of the late medieval stone gatehouse of Bermondsey Abbey. At number 7 is the Chamfered south jamb of the gateway with two wrought-iron gate-hooks projecting from the wall and a ‘Gatehouse’ sign. Numbers 5 to 11 form a group of historic houses and are found at the westernmost part of the road.

At number 67 is a Grade II*-listed double-fronted Queen Anne house dated circa 1700. The road also contains the interesting Grange House, which sits at the end of a cobbled stone road surrounded by an unusual painted passageway. At the corner of Grigg's Place there is as a former girls' charity school of the 1830s, which still retains the words "Bermondsey United Charity School for Girls" inscribed in stone. The cobbled Bridewain Street towards the eastern end of the road used to lead to a dairy.

Writing in 1873, author Edward Walton described Grange Walk (then known as Grange Road):

Grange Road, which was built on the pasture-ground belonging to the monastery, commences near the south-west corner of the square, and extends to what was till lately the Grange Farm, and continues onward to the ancient water-course called the Neckinger, over which is a bridge, leading to the water-side division of the parish... Retracing our steps through Bermondsey Street, and by Star Corner, we make our way to the south side of the Grange Road, mentioned above. Here we again encounter evidences of the manufacturing industry of Bermondsey, in the shape of its tan-yards — another of the numerous branches of trade arising out of the leather manufacture, which gives to Bermondsey so many of its characteristics.

== Redevelopment ==
The far eastern section of Grange Walk is undergoing extensive redevelopment with the construction of a large residential and retail area, which is on a site contiguous with the imposing listed Bermondsey Town Hall, which is also being renovated and converted into flats.
