= Matthew Baker (governor) =

Courtier and Governor of Jersey

Matthew Baker (? - May 1513, Bermondsey Abbey) was a courtier to Henry Tudor (both before and during his reign as Henry VII of England) and his son Henry VIII of England.

He was one of four Esquires For The Bodie and a companion of Henry Tudor during the future king's Breton and French exiles from 1471 until 1485; and he was Governor of Jersey from 1486 to 1494. He was initially appointed by letters patent (CPR Feb., 1 Hen VII) as joint-governor with another Esquire For The Bodie, David Philippe, on 28 February 1486 by Henry VII of England. He then became sole governor in 1488. His last day in the office before being recalled to England by King Henry VII for other duties was 3 September 1494.
