= Bermondsey Square =

Public square in Bermondsey, London

Coordinates: 51.4974°N 0.0811°W

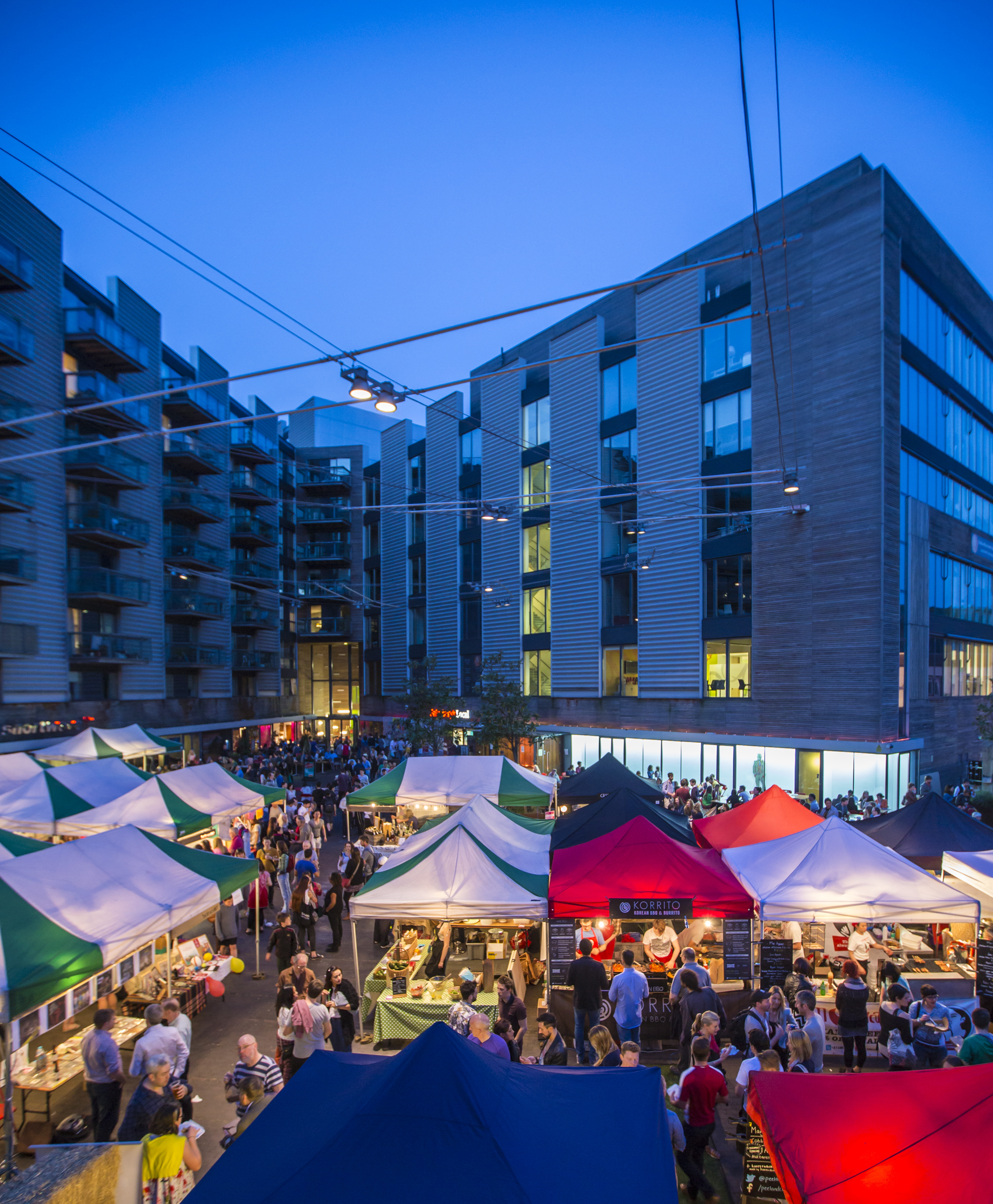
Bermondsey Square in 2014

Bermondsey Square is on Tower Bridge Road in Bermondsey, south London, England. It was the site of the 11th-century Bermondsey Abbey. The earliest medieval remains found are a Norman church from around 1080, which was recorded in the Domesday Book of 1086. The Abbey grounds were the original site of Bermondsey Market, which still takes place weekly in the Square. The area has subsequently undergone redevelopment and Bermondsey Square now contains apartments, offices, a boutique hotel, restaurants, and a contemporary art gallery.

Long Lane, leading northwest to Borough High Street, linked the Abbey with St George the Martyr church. To the west and heading north from the square is Bermondsey Street, leading to Tooley Street and London Bridge station.

The Arzner, an independent cinema dedicated to queer cinema is based in 10 Bermondsey Square.

== History ==
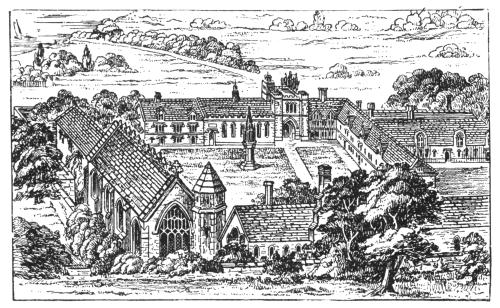
Bermondsey Abbey, located around the modern-day Bermondsey Square.

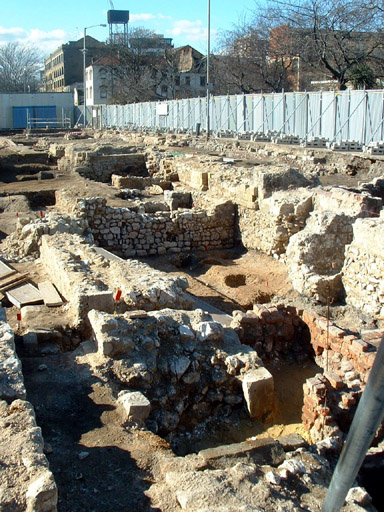
Bermondsey Abbey archaeological dig, viewed from Tower Bridge Road, 5 March 2006.

Bermondsey Square was formerly called the Court Yard and was originally the main quadrangle of Bermondsey Abbey. There was once a Chapel erected in 1699 by a Puritan divine. The chapel was subsequently a wool warehouse before it was demolished. At the entrance of the square, between the King John's Head public house and an oil shop, was the Abbey's gatehouse, which was removed in the early 19th century. Between the entrance to the Long Walk and a salt warehouse stood the Mansion House, built using material taken from the Abbey.
