= Jacob's Island =

Slum in Bermondsey, London, England

Coordinates: 51.5013°N 0.0706°W

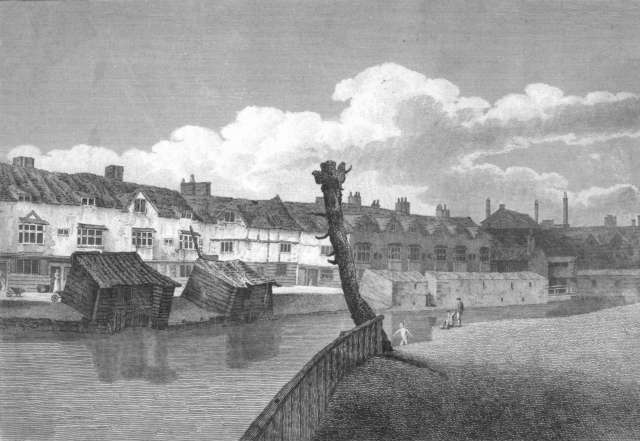
A drawing of Jacob's Island from 1813

Jacob's Island was a notorious slum in Bermondsey, London, in the 19th century. It was located on the south bank of the River Thames, approximately delineated by the modern streets of Mill Street, Bermondsey Wall West, George Row and Wolseley Street. Jacob's Island developed a reputation as one of the worst slums in London, and was popularised by the Charles Dickens novel Oliver Twist, published a few decades before the area was cleared in the 1860s.

== History ==
The origin of the name is not clear, but one possibility is that it derives from a vernacular term for frogs.

=== Swamp ===
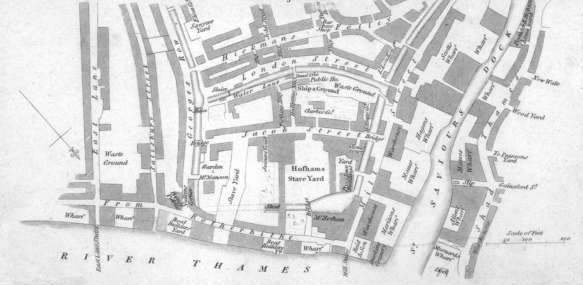
An 1813 map of Jacob's Island

Bermondsey was historically a rural parish on the outskirts of London until the 17th century when the area began to be developed as a wealthy suburb following the Great Fire of London. By the 19th century, the once affluent parts of Bermondsey had experienced a serious decline, and became the site of notorious slums with the arrival of industrialisation, docks and migrant housing, especially along the riverside.

The most notorious of the slums was known as Jacob's Island, with the boundary approximately the confluence of the Thames and subterranean River Neckinger, at St Saviour's Dock across from Shad Thames, to the west, a tidal ditch just west of George Row to the east, and another tidal ditch just north of London Street (now Wolseley Street) to the south. It was a particularly squalid rookery, and described as "The very capital of cholera" and "The Venice of drains" by The Morning Chronicle in 1849.

In the 1840s it became "a site of radical activity", and, after attention from novelists Charles Dickens and Charles Kingsley, joined other London areas of "literary-criminal notoriety" that emerged "as symbols of a developing urban counterculture". The 19th-century social researcher Henry Mayhew described Jacob's Island as a "pest island" with "literally the smell of a graveyard" and "crazy and rotten bridges" crossing the tidal ditches, with drains from houses discharging directly into them, and the water harbouring masses of rotting weed, animal carcasses and dead fish. He describes the water being "as red as blood" in some parts, as a result of pollutant tanning agents from the leather dressers in the area.

=== Clearance and redevelopment ===
In the early 1850s Jacob's Island was gradually removed as part of a slum clearance, starting with the tidal ditches that formed the eastern and southern boundaries being filled. In 1861, the slum was partly destroyed by a fire, and the area later redeveloped as warehouses. In 1865, Richard King, writing in A Handbook for Travellers in Surrey, Hampshire, and the Isle of Wight, observed that "Many of the buildings have been pulled down since Oliver Twist was written, but the island is still entitled to its bad pre-eminence". A decade later, a missionary for the London City Mission provided a more positive report:

The foul ditch no longer pollutes the air. It has long been filled up ... there is now a good solid road ... Part of London Street, the whole of Little London Street, part of Mill Street, beside houses in Jacob Street and Hickman's Folly, have been demolished. In most of these places warehouses have taken the place of dwelling-houses. The revolting fact of many of the inhabitants of the district having no other water to drink than that which they procured from the filthy ditches is also a thing of the past. Most of the houses are now supplied with good water, and the streets are very well paved. Indeed, so great is the change for the better in the external appearance of the district generally, that a person who had not seen it since the improvements would now scarcely recognise it.

Charles William Heckethorn had reservations about these improvements, telling readers of London Souvenirs in 1899, that "Many of the horrors of Jacob's Island are now things of the past ... in fact, the romance of the place is gone".

In 1934, a new public housing development called the Dickens Estate was opened on the site of the former Jacob's Island. The houses of the development were named after Dickens' characters but the only one to have lived, and died, on Jacob's Island, the murderous Bill Sikes, was not honoured.

== Fiction ==
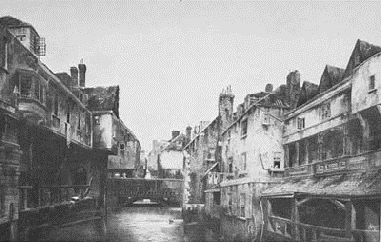
Folly Ditch, near Mill Street, Jacob's Island, circa 1840

=== Charles Dickens ===
Jacob's Island was immortalised by Charles Dickens's novel Oliver Twist, in which the villain Bill Sikes dies in the mud of 'Folly Ditch'. Dickens provides a vivid description of what it was like:

... crazy wooden galleries common to the backs of half a dozen houses, with holes from which to look upon the slime beneath; windows, broken and patched, with poles thrust out, on which to dry the linen that is never there; rooms so small, so filthy, so confined, that the air would seem to be too tainted even for the dirt and squalor which they shelter; wooden chambers thrusting themselves out above the mud and threatening to fall into it – as some have done; dirt-besmeared walls and decaying foundations, every repulsive lineament of poverty, every loathsome indication of filth, rot, and garbage: all these ornament the banks of Folly Ditch.

Dickens was taken to this then-impoverished and unsavory location by the officers of the river police, with whom he would occasionally go on patrol.

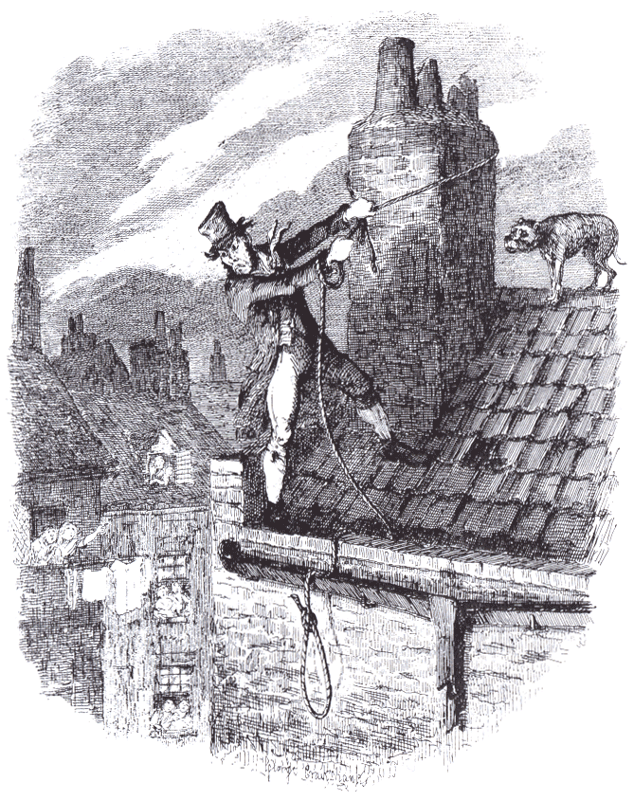
Illustrator George Cruikshank depicts Bill Sikes' attempt at escape from his rooftop in Oliver Twist.

Dickens wrote in a preface to Oliver Twist, in March 1850, that in the intervening years his descriptions of the disease, crime and poverty of Jacob's Island had come to sound so fanciful to some that Sir Peter Laurie, a former Lord Mayor of London, had expressed his belief publicly that the location was a work of imagination and that no place by that name, or like it, had ever existed. (Laurie had himself been fictionalised, a few years earlier, as Alderman Cute in Dickens' short novel The Chimes).

==== Site of 'Bill Sikes' house' ====
In 1911, the Bermondsey Council opposed a suggestion by the London County Council that George's Yard, in Bermondsey, should be renamed "Twist's Court", to reflect the site of the demise of the Dickens' character Bill Sikes. Nine years later, G. W. Mitchell, a clerk with the Bermondsey Council found a plan dated 5 April 1855, in the London County Council archives, which showed 'Bill Sykes' house' marked on Jacob's Island. This was at a time when the London County Council was proposing that Jacob's Island should be 'demolished'. The following year, it was noted that "so accurately" did Dickens "describe the scene that the house that he chose for Bill Sikes's end was easily located" in 1855, and "became a Dickens' landmark", leading it to be marked on the Council's plan.

At the time of the 1920s news reports, the site of the house, which had been in Metcalf Court as shown in a reproduction of the 1855 plan, was behind 18 Eckell Street (formerly Edwards Street), and "occupied as stables by Messers. R. Chartors and Co.". But "in the time of a Dickens" it overlooked the Folly Ditch on one side and was approached by means of "two wooden bridges across the mill stream', and was "used by thieves of the area".

In The Mysteries of Paris and London (1992), author Richard Maxwell describes a poster in 1846 inviting Jacob's Island residents to celebrate the end of the Corn Laws. Maxwell identifies the location given on the poster of "that highly interesting Spot, described by Charles Dickens" as the site of Bill Sikes' house.

=== Charles Kingsley ===
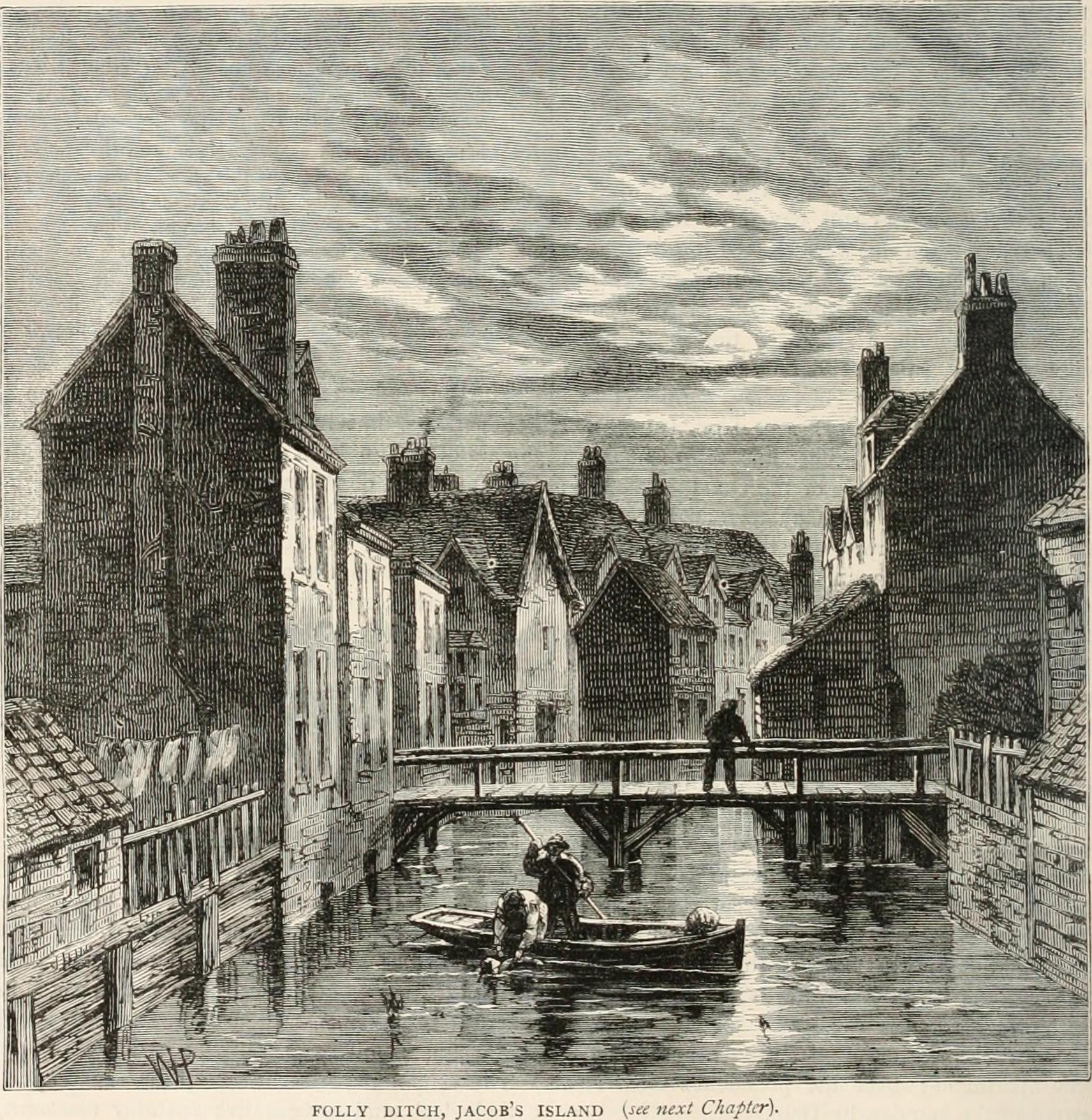
Engraving of Folly Ditch from the 19th century

In Charles Kingsley's 1850 novel Alton Locke, the title character visits Jacob's Island and sees the death of the drunken Jimmy Downes, who has been reduced to poverty, and the bodies of his family, taken by typhus. Kingsley had been inspired by the accounts of the 1849 cholera epidemics published by The Morning Chronicle to visit Jacob's Island with his friend Charles Blachford Mansfield. In addition to his fictional portrayal, Kingsley joined with Mansfield and fellow Christian socialist John Malcolm Forbes Ludlow in purchasing water-carts that were sent to Jacob's Island to supply clean drinking water to the residents.

== Current use ==
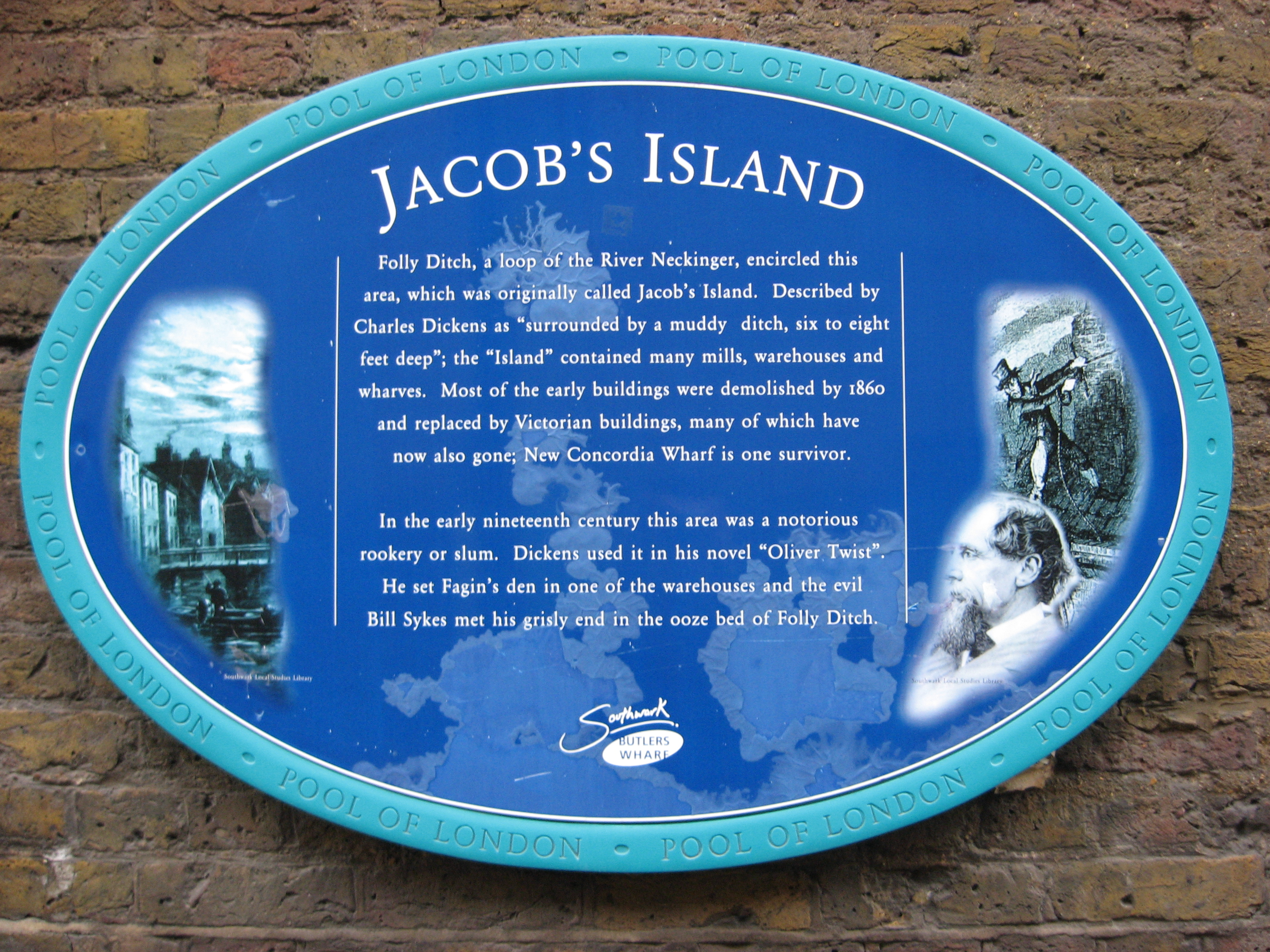
Blue plaque (historic marker) on the site of Jacob's Island

The site of the former Jacob's Island was heavily damaged in the Blitz during World War II, when it was extensively bombed by the Luftwaffe due to the industrial presence in the area. Today it is part of the London Borough of Southwark, with only one of the Victorian warehouses surviving. In 1981, the area was one of the first in the former Port of London to be converted to expensive loft apartments as part of the London Docklands redevelopment, which have since been joined by new blocks of luxury flats, including a development by architects Lifschutz Davidson Sandilands.

Since the early 1990s the Jacob's Island area has undergone considerable regeneration and gentrification, with significant friction at times between the new land-based arrivals and the more bohemian set based in the houseboats moored just offshore at Reed Wharf.

== See also ==
- 1854 Broad Street cholera outbreak
- List of demolished buildings and structures in London
