= Shad Thames =

Area of Bermondsey in London, England

Coordinates: 51.5019°N 0.0725°W

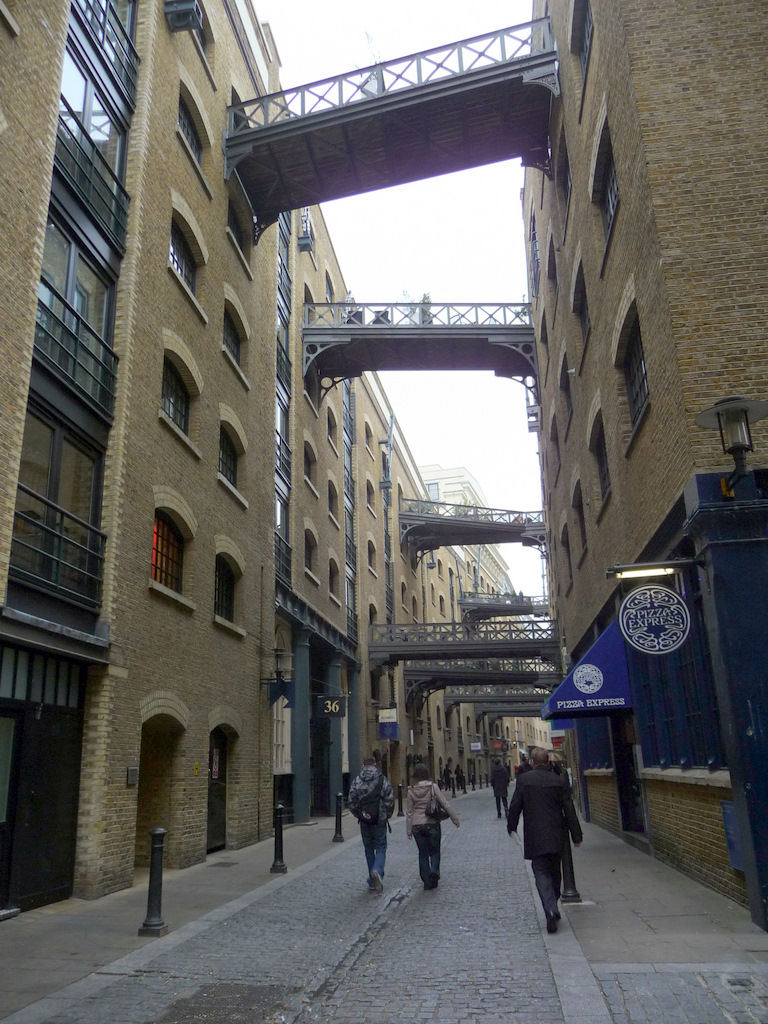
The street Shad Thames, looking east

Shad Thames is a historic riverside street next to Tower Bridge in Bermondsey, London, England, and is also an informal name for the surrounding area. In the 19th century, the street included the largest warehouse complex in London.

== Location ==
Shad Thames is located in Bermondsey. From Tower Bridge at its west end, the road runs along the south side of the River Thames, set back behind a row of converted warehouses. At St Saviour's Dock the road makes a 90° turn to run alongside the dock

The street is partly cobbled. The nearest stations are Tower Hill, Tower Gateway (both requiring a river crossing to access), Bermondsey and London Bridge.

== Name ==
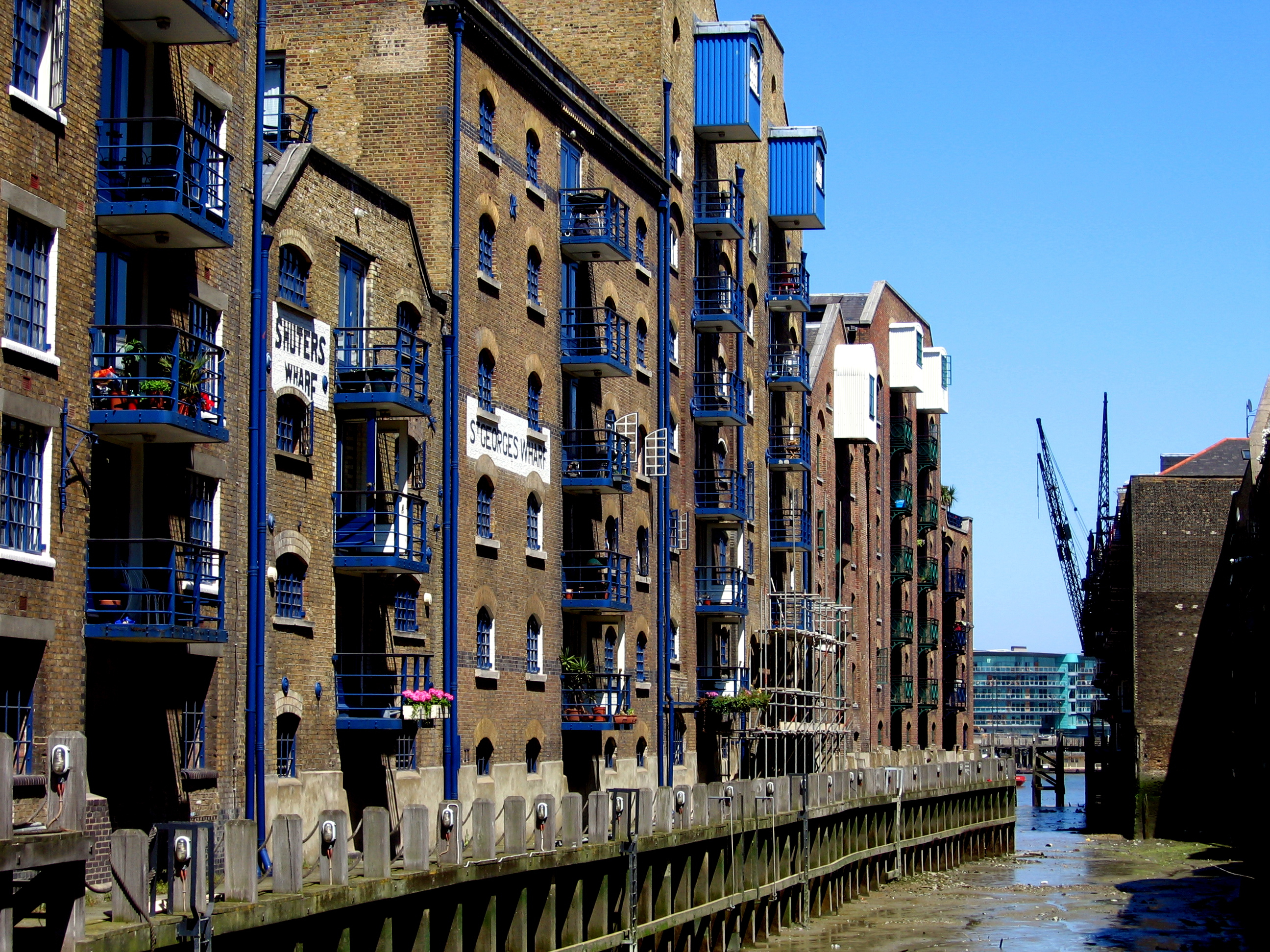
St Saviour's Dock, looking north toward the Thames

The street Shad Thames appears by name on John Rocque's 1747 map of London. One theory is that the name is a corruption of 'St John-at-Thames', possibly linked to the Order of Knights of the Hospital of Saint John of Jerusalem, which owned land in the area.

Another theory is that the name comes from the fish known as shad, a type of river herring that was once common in the Thames. Species such as the allis shad and twaite shad (Alosa alosa and Alosa fallax) were historically caught in the river, and it is possible that the street was associated with fish landings, processing, or markets related to the species.

The surrounding area is also now commonly referred to as Shad Thames, or Butler's Wharf (named after the largest of the original warehouses along the riverfront). Both names describe a 350 m × 250 m (1,148 ft × 820 ft) area of streets, restored warehouses and newer buildings, bordered by the Thames, Tower Bridge Road, Tooley Street and St Saviour's Dock (or, by some definitions, Mill Street). It lies in the most north-easterly part of the SE1 postcode district.

=== Horselydown ===
The "Woodcut" map of London from around 1561 calls the wider area "Horssey Down". The 1872 Ordnance Survey 1:2500 map labels it as "St John Horselydown", referring to the parish of St John's Church in Horselydown, although that parish covered a larger area than the present-day Shad Thames. The name may be a version of "Horse Down", reflecting its earlier use as pasture for horses and cattle.

== Industrial history ==
In Victorian times, Shad Thames included the largest warehouse complex in London. Completed in 1873, the warehouses housed huge quantities of tea, coffee, spices and other commodities, which were unloaded and loaded onto river boats. For this reason, the area became known as the 'larder of London'. An 1878 book says:

Shad Thames, and, indeed, the whole river-side, contain extensive granaries and storehouses for the supply of the metropolis. Indeed, from Morgan's Lane—a turning about the middle of Tooley Street, on the north side, to St. Saviour's (once called Savory) Dock, the whole line of street—called in one part Pickle Herring Street, and in another Shad Thames—exhibits an uninterrupted series of wharves, warehouses, mills, and factories, on both sides of the narrow and crowded roadway.

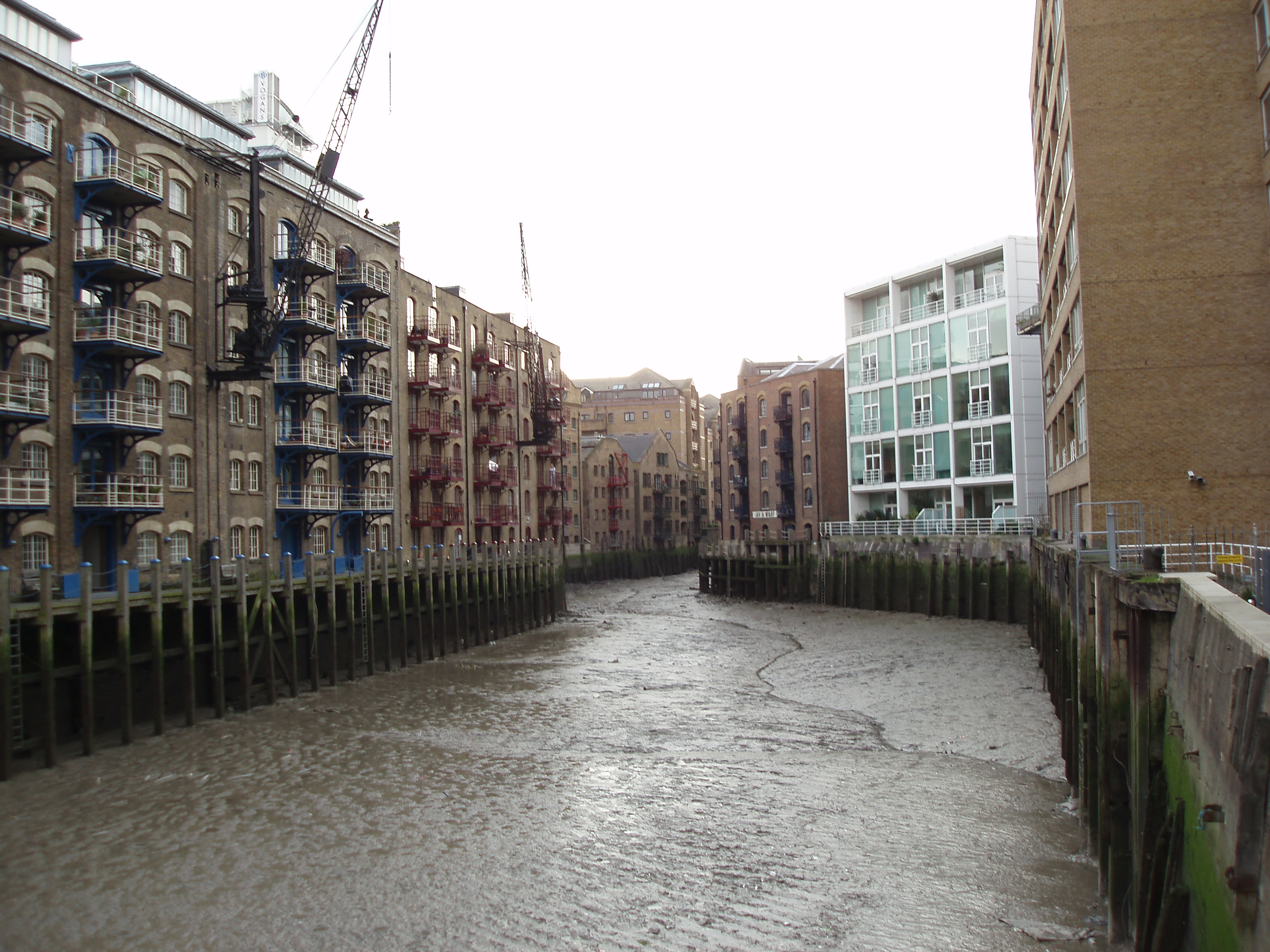
St Saviour's Dock, looking south toward the Dock end

During the 20th century, the area went into decline as congestion and containerization forced shipping to unload goods further east, and the last warehouses closed in 1972.

Many artists lived in the area in the 1970s (presumably owing to the low cost of living there); these reportedly included David Hockney and Derek Jarman.

Shad Thames was regenerated in the 1980s and 1990s, when the disused but picturesque warehouses throughout the area were converted into expensive flats, many with restaurants, bars, shops, etc. on the ground floor.

== Places of interest ==
As part of the regeneration of the area, designer and restaurateur Terence Conran opened a number of now well-known riverside restaurants, including Le Pont de la Tour, the Blueprint Cafe and the Butler's Wharf Chop House. The area also includes numerous cafes, bars, shops and estate agents.

Public access to the riverside was obtained by local community activists including Maggie Blake, after whom an alley leading from Shad Thames to the riverfront, Maggie Blake's Cause, is named.

Terence Conran was also involved in founding the Design Museum near the east end of Shad Thames, which housed exhibitions of graphic and product design; however, the museum relocated to Kensington in 2016 to a larger building formerly occupied by the Commonwealth Institute. The former Design Museum was largely empty as of April 2017 and was expected to be converted into luxury apartments.

The presence nearby of Tower Bridge, the Tower of London, Potters Fields Park, More London (where various cultural events take place) and The Shard means that this once-overlooked area is now frequented by tourists.

== Residents and properties ==
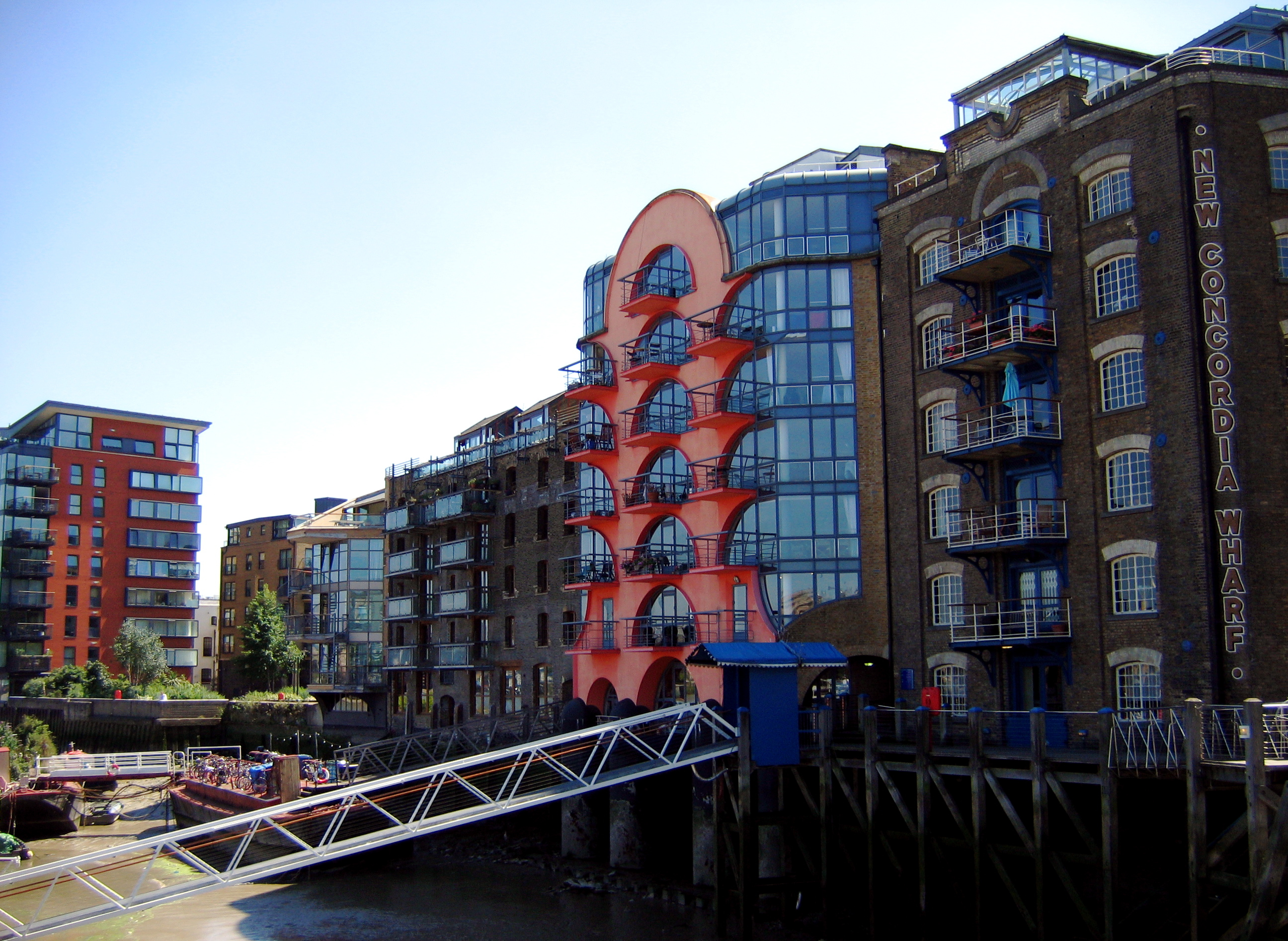
The east end of the Shad Thames area. The pink building is China Wharf.

Shad Thames has many residents, particularly living in converted warehouses, and development of new flats continues. They are represented by the Shad Thames Residents’ Association. The converted warehouses retain their original characteristic features of brickwork, winches, large sign-writing and so on, and most are named after the commodities which were originally stored in them – Vanilla & Sesame Court, Cayenne Court, Wheat Wharf, Tea Trade Wharf, with further buildings named after cinnamon, cardamom, fennel, caraway, ginger, cumin, tamarind, clove, anise and coriander. It is said that a century of spices had infused into the brickwork, so after they were converted into flats the first residents of each building could still detect the scent after which it was named. Various new buildings have been constructed, with similarly evocative names, such as Spice Quay Heights and China Wharf.

Shad Thames's proximity to the City of London, which is about a mile north-west on the other side of the river, means that many residents are wealthy City workers, and the restaurants are frequented by City folk at lunchtime. Consequently, local property prices are very high. Properties with river views are particularly expensive, having balconies and dramatic views of the Thames, Wapping (across the river), Tower Bridge, the "Gherkin", and even the distant Canary Wharf, though flats nearer the bridge also command a view of the grey concrete Guoman Hotel (formerly known as the Tower Hotel) on the north side of the river, considered by many to be an eyesore. Most of the warehouses retain the original relatively small windows, which limit their views; some of the newer buildings have better views—for example, flats on the east end of Spice Quay Heights have wide floor-to-ceiling windows on two sides. One of the student residences of the London School of Economics is located on Gainsford Street in the centre of the area.

Among the most striking features of Shad Thames are the walkways which criss-cross the street high overhead. Most of them now connect the Butlers Wharf building and the Cardamom Building and were originally used as bridges to roll barrels and the like between warehouses. They are now used as balconies by the adjoining flats. Photographs from the early 20th century show that at the peak of warehouse usage there were many more of these bridges than survive today.

== The river ==
Tower Bridge viewed from Shad Thames

A wide variety of vessels travel along the Thames next to Shad Thames. This stretch of the river, known as the Pool of London, is particularly deep and has historically accommodated large ships. From time to time, full-sized cruise ships and naval vessels moor nearby, usually staying for a day before passing through Tower Bridge. They cannot proceed any further upstream than London Bridge.

Regular river traffic includes police boats, speedboats, and passenger services. One notable example is the Tate to Tate catamaran service, which connects Tate Britain and Tate Modern. In 2004, one of the boats was decorated by artist Damien Hirst with his signature spot pattern.

Yachts and leisure craft from St Katharine Docks, located on the north side of the river opposite Shad Thames, also pass by frequently.

== Cultural references ==
=== Film and television ===
Owing to its cobbled streets, historic warehouses, riverside views and proximity to landmarks such as Tower Bridge, Shad Thames has frequently been used as a filming location for cinema and television, including:

- The Long Memory (1952), featuring scenes set in Shad Thames
- Alfie (1966), filmed at Butler's Wharf
- Oliver! (1968), partly filmed at New Concordia Wharf; the original novel by Charles Dickens features Jacob's Island, located just east of Shad Thames
- Diamonds on Wheels (1974), filmed in the area before warehouse conversions
- Jubilee (1978), with scenes in and around the warehouses
- The Elephant Man (1980), shot partly in Butler’s Wharf
- The French Lieutenant's Woman (1981), using the riverside setting
- The Friends of Mr Cairo (1982), video for Jon and Vangelis single, using still images at the junction with Lafone Street
- Resurrection of the Daleks (1984), a Doctor Who serial that featured Shad Thames as the location of the Daleks' time corridor
- Dempsey and Makepeace (1985), with the story climax filmed in the dockside area and on Tower Bridge
- A Fish Called Wanda (1988), with John Cleese’s character seen dangling from an upper storey of Reed's Wharf
- Bernard and the Genie (1991), a BBC television film
- The World Is Not Enough (1999), whose opening boat chase passes New Concordia Wharf and continues along St Saviour's Dock
- Bridget Jones's Diary (2001), featuring exterior shots along Shad Thames
- Viruddh (2005), a Bollywood film with scenes filmed at Spice Quay Heights
- Jhoom Barabar Jhoom (2007), with dance scenes near the Java Wharf buildings
- Goal (2007), another Bollywood production using the area
- Harry Potter and the Order of the Phoenix (2007), filmed at Butler's Wharf
- Run Fatboy Run (2007), filmed on the riverfront
- Spooks (2010), with scenes along Shad Thames
- Set the Thames on Fire (2015), inspired by the area's distinctive industrial architecture
- Penny Dreadful, in which Dr Victor Frankenstein is shown living at 17 Shad Thames
- Death in Paradise (2017), featured in a special London-based two-part episode
- Come Away (2020), which used Shad Thames to represent a Victorian market
- Cruella (2021), featuring several scenes set along the riverside
- Sonic the Hedgehog 3 (2024), filmed partially in the area

=== Music ===
An instrumental track called "Shad Thames" appears on the 1997 Saint Etienne album Continental and 2001 compilation Smash the System.
