= London Fetish Film Festival =

Annual fetish film festival in London, England

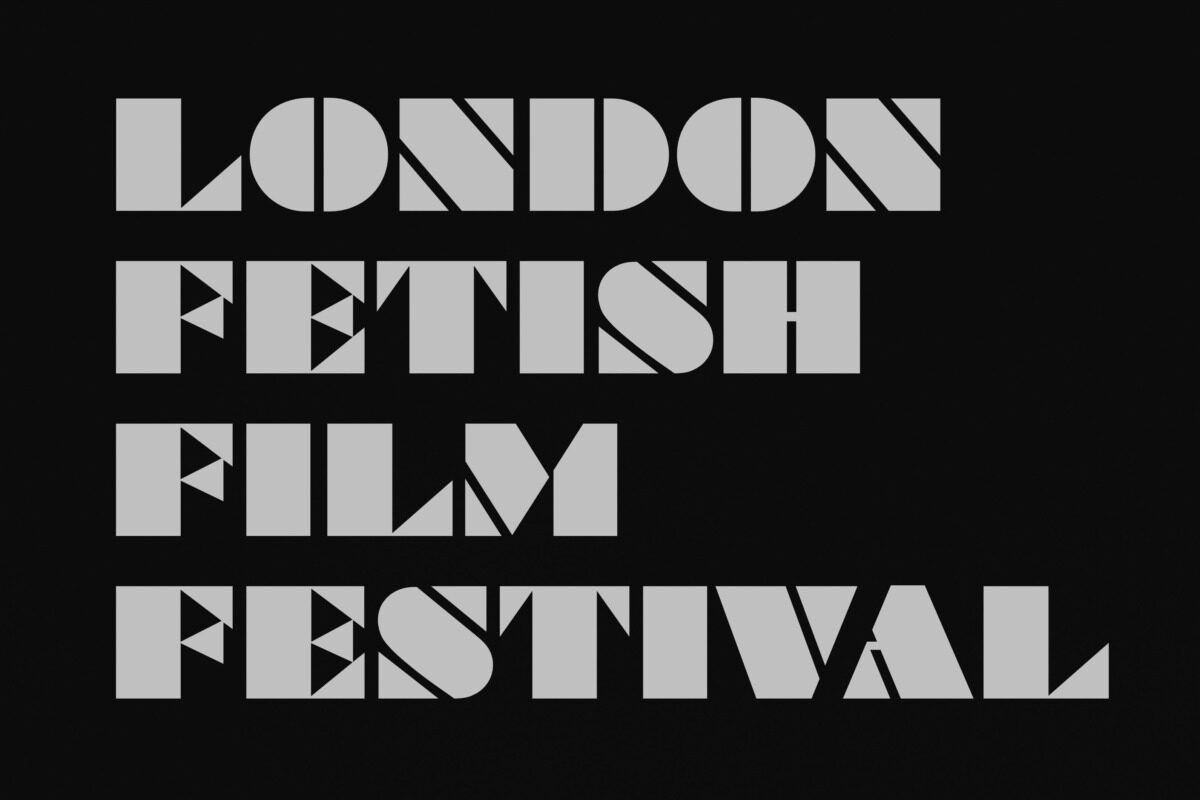
- Genre: Film festival
- Frequency: Annually
- Location: London
- Country: United Kingdom
- Inaugurated: 2016

The London Fetish Film Festival (LFFF) is an annual film festival held in London to celebrate fetish films.

The festival was established by its founders Venus Raven and Tainted Saint in 2016. Following its conversion to a multi-day event in 2019, it had to be held as an online streaming video event in 2020 due to the COVID-19 epidemic.

The 2023 festival was held at the Hen and Chickens Theatre in Highbury.

The seventh London Fetish Film Festival is scheduled to be shown at The Arzner in Bermondsey in February 2026.
