= East End of London =

Area of London, England

Coordinates: 51°30′51″N 00°03′18″W

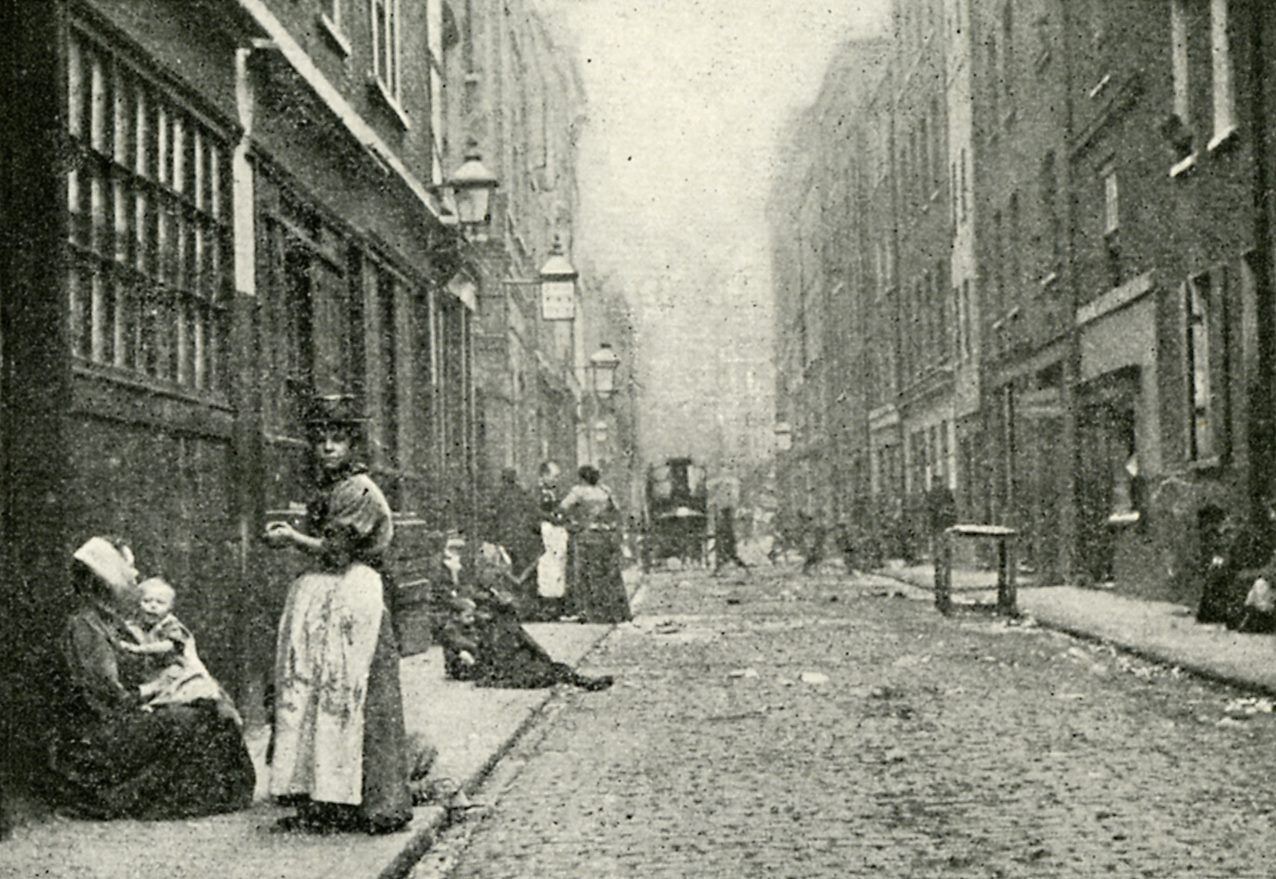
Dorset Street, Spitalfields, photographed in 1902 for Jack London's book The People of the Abyss

The East End of London, often referred to within the London area simply as the East End, is the historic core of wider East London, east of the Roman and medieval walls of the City of London and north of the River Thames. It does not have universally accepted boundaries on its northern and eastern sides, though the River Lea is usually seen as the easternmost boundary. Parts of it may be regarded as lying within Central London (though that term too has no precise definition). The term "East of Aldgate Pump" is sometimes used as a synonym for the area.

The East End began to emerge in the Middle Ages with initially slow urban growth outside the eastern walls, which later accelerated, especially in the 19th century, to absorb pre-existing settlements. The first known written record of the East End as a distinct entity, as opposed to its component parts, comes from John Strype's 1720 Survey of London, which describes London as consisting of four parts: the City of London, Westminster, Southwark, and "That Part beyond the Tower". The relevance of Strype's reference to the Tower was more than geographical. The East End was the urbanised part of an administrative area called the Tower Division, which had owed military service to the Tower of London since time immemorial. Later, as London grew further, the fully urbanised Tower Division became a byword for wider East London, before East London grew further still, east of the River Lea and into Essex.

The area was notorious for its deep poverty, overcrowding and associated social problems. This led to the East End's history of intense political activism and association with some of the country's most influential social reformers. Another major theme of East End history has been migration, both inward and outward. The area had a strong pull on the rural poor from other parts of England, and attracted waves of migration from further afield, notably Huguenot refugees, Irish weavers, Ashkenazi Jews, and, in the 20th century, Bengalis.

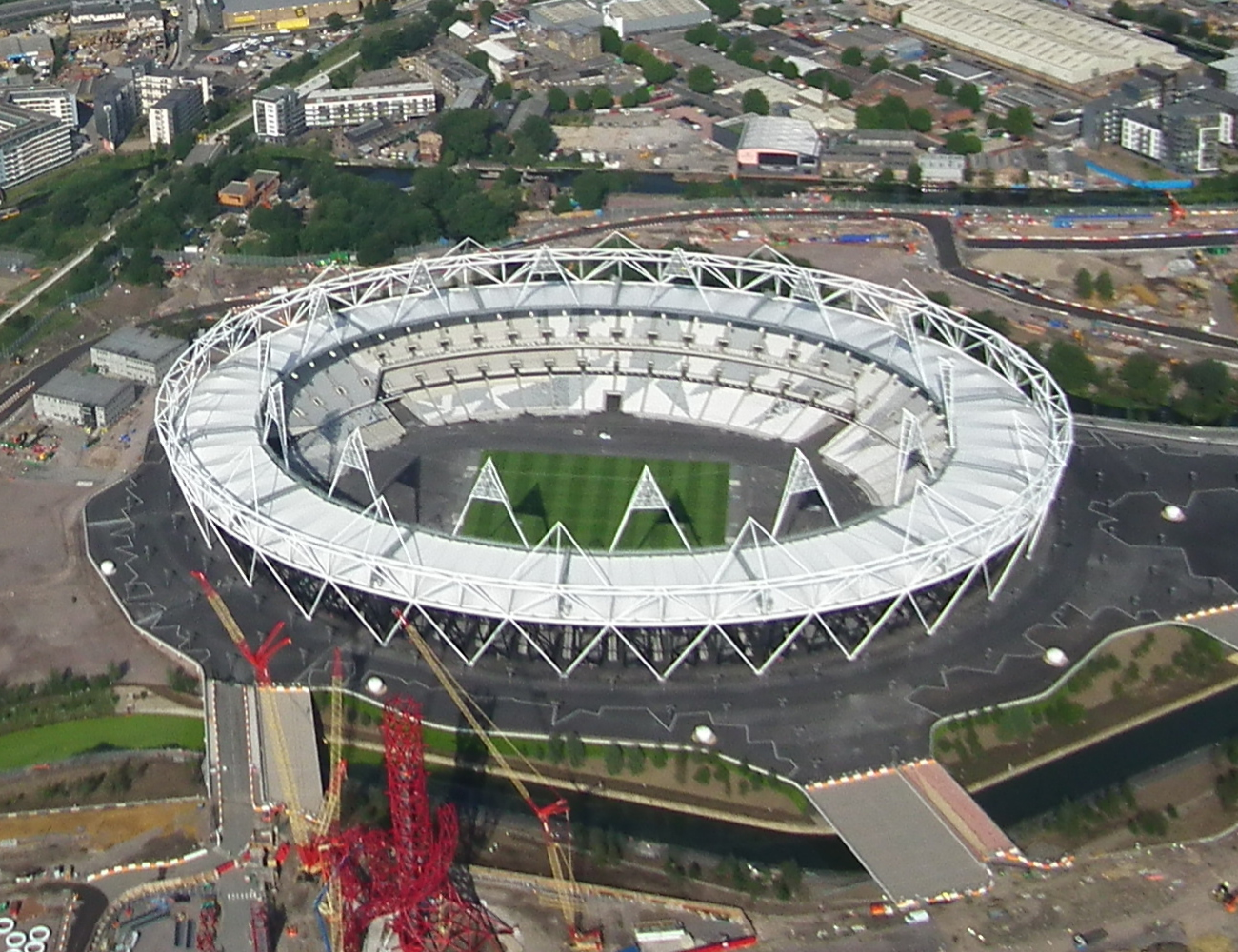
The River Lea at Stratford, with the Olympic Stadium under construction in June 2011

The closure of the last of the Port of London's East End docks in 1980 created further challenges and led to attempts at regeneration, with Canary Wharf and the Olympic Park among the most successful examples. Paradoxically, while some parts of the East End are undergoing rapid change and are amongst the areas with the highest mean salary in the UK, it also continues to contain some of the worst poverty in Great Britain.

== Uncertain boundaries ==
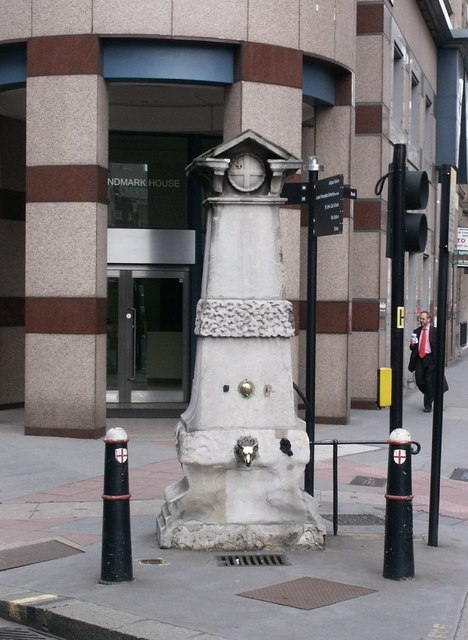
Aldgate Pump: the symbolic start of the East End

The extramural eastern wards of Bishopsgate Without and the Portsoken.

The East End lies east of the Roman and medieval walls of the City of London and north of the River Thames. Aldgate Pump on the edge of the City is regarded as the symbolic start of the East End. On the river, the Tower Dock inlet, just west of the Tower of London and Tower Bridge marks the beginning of the London Borough of Tower Hamlets and its older predecessors.

Beyond these reference points, the East End has no official or generally accepted boundaries; views vary as to how much of wider East London lies within it.

In extending from the line of the former walls, the area is taken to include the small ancient extramural City wards of Bishopsgate Without and the Portsoken (as established until 21st century boundary reviews). The various channels of the River Lea are sometimes viewed as the eastern boundary.

Beyond the small eastern extramural wards, the narrowest definition restricts the East End to the modern London Borough of Tower Hamlets. A more common preference is to add to Tower Hamlets the former parish and borough of Shoreditch (including Hoxton and Haggerston), which is now the southern part of the modern London Borough of Hackney. Other commentators prefer a definition broader still, encompassing districts such as West Ham, East Ham, Leyton, Walthamstow, parts or all of Hackney (the district, rather than the larger modern borough) and Ilford.

The wider East London area might be said to comprise, or approximate to, the two eastern wards of the City, the former Tower Division and those parts of London east of the Lea (known as Metropolitan Essex').

== Development and economy ==
=== Origins ===
The East End developed along the Thames, and beyond Bishopsgate and Aldgate, the gates in the city wall that lay east of the little Walbrook river. These gates, first built with the wall in the late second or early third centuries, secured the entrance of pre-existing roads (the modern A10 and A11/A12) into the walled area. The walls were such a constraint to growth, that the position of the gates has been fundamental to the shaping of the capital, especially in the then suburbs outside the wall.

The walled City was built on two hills separated by the Walbrook, Ludgate Hill to the west and Cornhill (of which Tower Hill is a shoulder), to the east. During the Anglo-Saxon period the two sides were under separate administration and had distinct economies, character, customs and regulations. Even beyond the walls, the Walbrook (in part following Blomfield Street) separated landholdings, with the Soke of Cripplegate to the west and the Soke of Bishopsgate to the east. The western side was more populous and prosperous, it had the cathedral, the royal palace (which later moved to Westminster) and its large market, Westcheap, was focussed on land-based trade. The east was poorer and more sparsely settled; its smaller market, Eastcheap, was sited near the river to allow it to specialise in seaborne trade. These intramural distinctions would persist, if less markedly, and influence the development that subsequently occurred beyond the walls.

Beyond the wall, the landholdings which would ultimately shape modern administrative divisions were in place before the Domesday census of the 1070s. The land outside Aldgate was held by the Cnichtengild, a fighting organisation responsible for the defence of Aldgate and the nearby walls. The land inside and outside Bishopsgate seems to have been the responsibility of the Bishop of London (the Bishop of the East Saxons), who was promoting building in the underdeveloped eastern side of the walled area, and who may also have had a role in defending Bishopsgate itself. Apart from parts of Shoreditch, the rest of the area was part of the Bishop of London's Manor of Stepney. The Manor's lands were the basis of a later unit called the Tower Division, or Tower Hamlets which extended as far north as Stamford Hill. It is thought that the manor was held by the Bishop of London, in compensation for his duties in maintaining and garrisoning the Tower of London. The oldest recorded reference to this obligation is from 1554, but it is thought to pre-date that by centuries.

These landholdings would become the basis of the ancient parishes and city wards which, by occasional fission and mergers, developed into the administrative units of today.

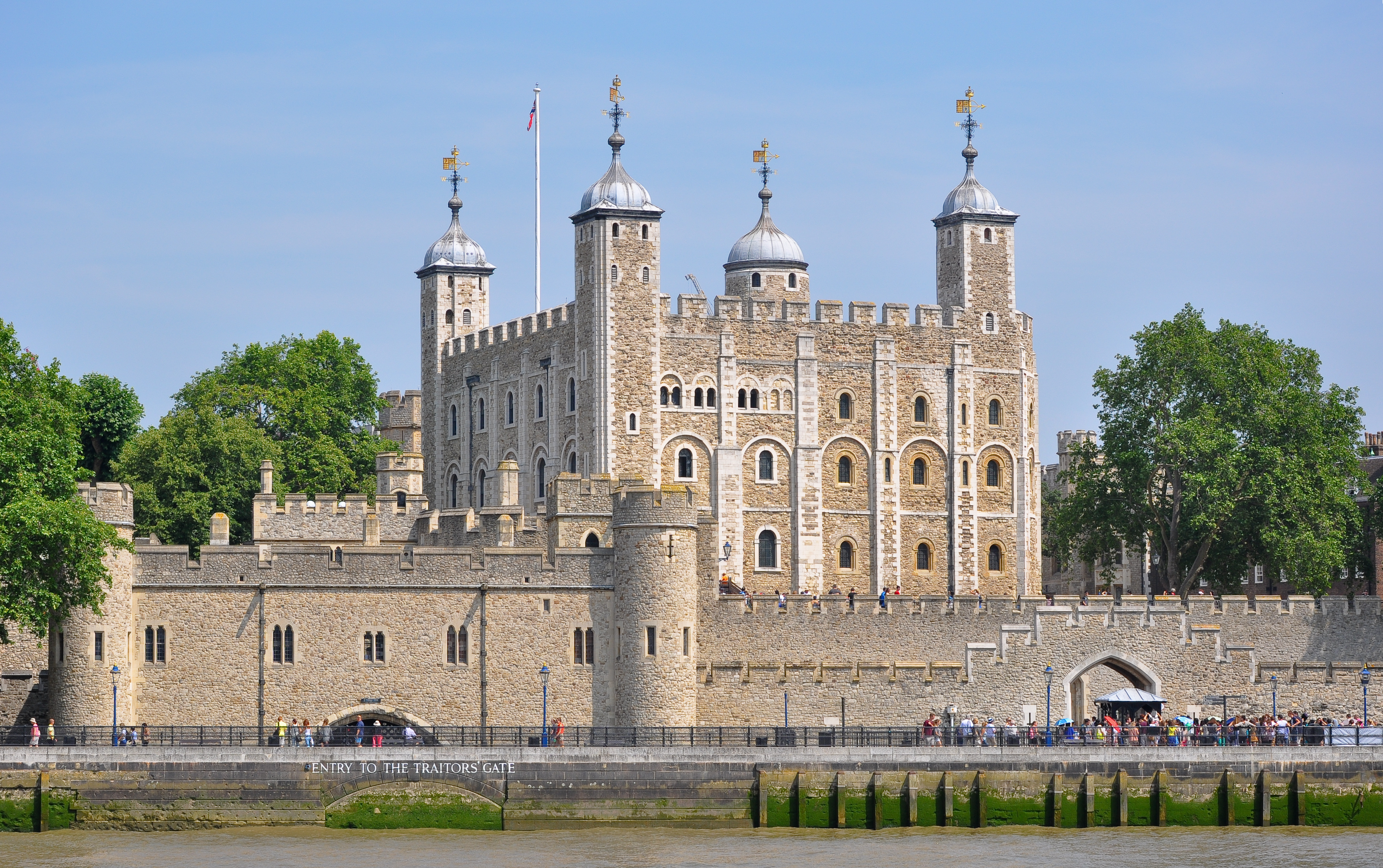
The Tower of London was the administrative and geographic cornerstone of the Tower Division

London in 1300: development is mainly limited to the walled area.

Five monastic institutions, centres of learning and charity, were established just outside the walls: Bedlam, Holywell Priory, The New Hospital of St Mary without Bishopsgate, the Abbey of the Minoresses of St. Clare without Aldgate, Eastminster near the Tower, and St Katharine's on the Thames.

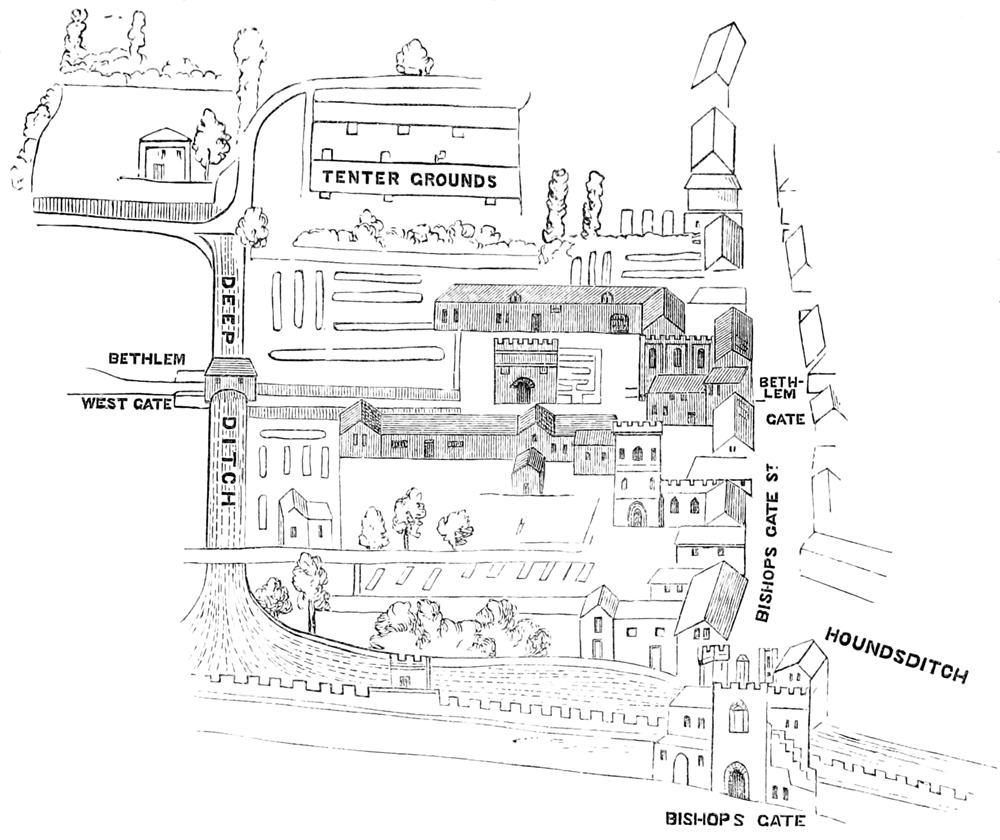
The first Bethlem (or Bedlam) Hospital, outside Bishopsgate, beside the Deepditch, a part of the Walbrook river.

Bromley was home to St Leonards Priory and Barking Abbey, important as a religious centre since Norman times was where William the Conqueror had first established his English court. Further east the Cistercian Stratford Langthorne Abbey became the court of Henry III in 1267 for the visitation of the Papal legates, and it was here that he made peace with the barons under the terms of the Dictum of Kenilworth. It became the fifth largest Abbey in the country, visited by monarchs and providing a retreat (and a final resting place) for the nobility. Edward I held his parliament at Stepney in 1299.

The lands east of the City have sometimes been used as hunting grounds for bishops and royalty. The Bishop of London had a palace at Bethnal Green, King John is reputed to have established a palace at Bow and Henry VIII established a hunting lodge at Bromley Hall.

The rural population of the area grew considerably in the Medieval period, despite reductions caused by the Norman Conquest and the Black Death. The pattern of agricultural settlement in south-east England was typically of dispersed farmhouses, rather than nucleated villages. However the presence of the city and maritime trades as a market for goods and services led to a thriving mixed economy in the countryside of the Manor of Stepney. This led to large settlements, inhabited mostly by tradesmen (rather than farmers) to develop along the major roads forming hamlets such as Mile End and Bow. These settlements would expand and merge with the development radiating out from London itself.

=== Emergence and character ===
Geography was a major factor influencing the character of the developing East End; prevailing winds flow, like the river, west to east. The flow of the river led to the maritime trades concentrating in the east and the prevailing wind encouraged the most polluting industries to concentrate eastwards.

Metalworking industries are recorded between Aldgate and Bishopsgate in the 1300s and ship building for the navy is recorded at Ratcliff in 1354, with shipfitting and repair carried out in Blackwall by 1485 and a major fishing port developed downstream at Barking to provide fish for the City. These and other factors meant that industries relating to construction, repair, and victualling of naval and merchant ships flourished in the area but the City of London retained its right to land the goods, until 1799.

Growth was much slower in the east, than in the large western suburb, with the modest eastern suburb separated from the much smaller northern extension by Moorfields adjacent to the wall on the north side. Moorfields was an open area with a marshy chararacter due to London's Wall acting as a dam, impeding the flow of the Walbrook and restricting development in that direction. Moorfields remained open until 1817, and the longstanding presence of that open space separating the emerging East End from the western and small northern suburb must have helped shape the different economic character of the areas and perceptions of their distinct identity (see map below). Shoreditch's boundary with the parish of St Luke's (which, like its predecessor St Giles-without-Cripplegate served the Finsbury area) ran through the Moorfields countryside. These boundaries remained consistent after urbanisation and so might be said to delineate east and north London. The boundary line, with very slight modifications, has also become the boundary between the modern London Boroughs of Hackney and Islington.

Building accelerated in the late 16th century, and the area that would later become known as the East End began to take shape. Writing in 1603, John Stow described the squalid riverside development, extending nearly as far as Ratcliff, which had developed mostly within his lifetime.

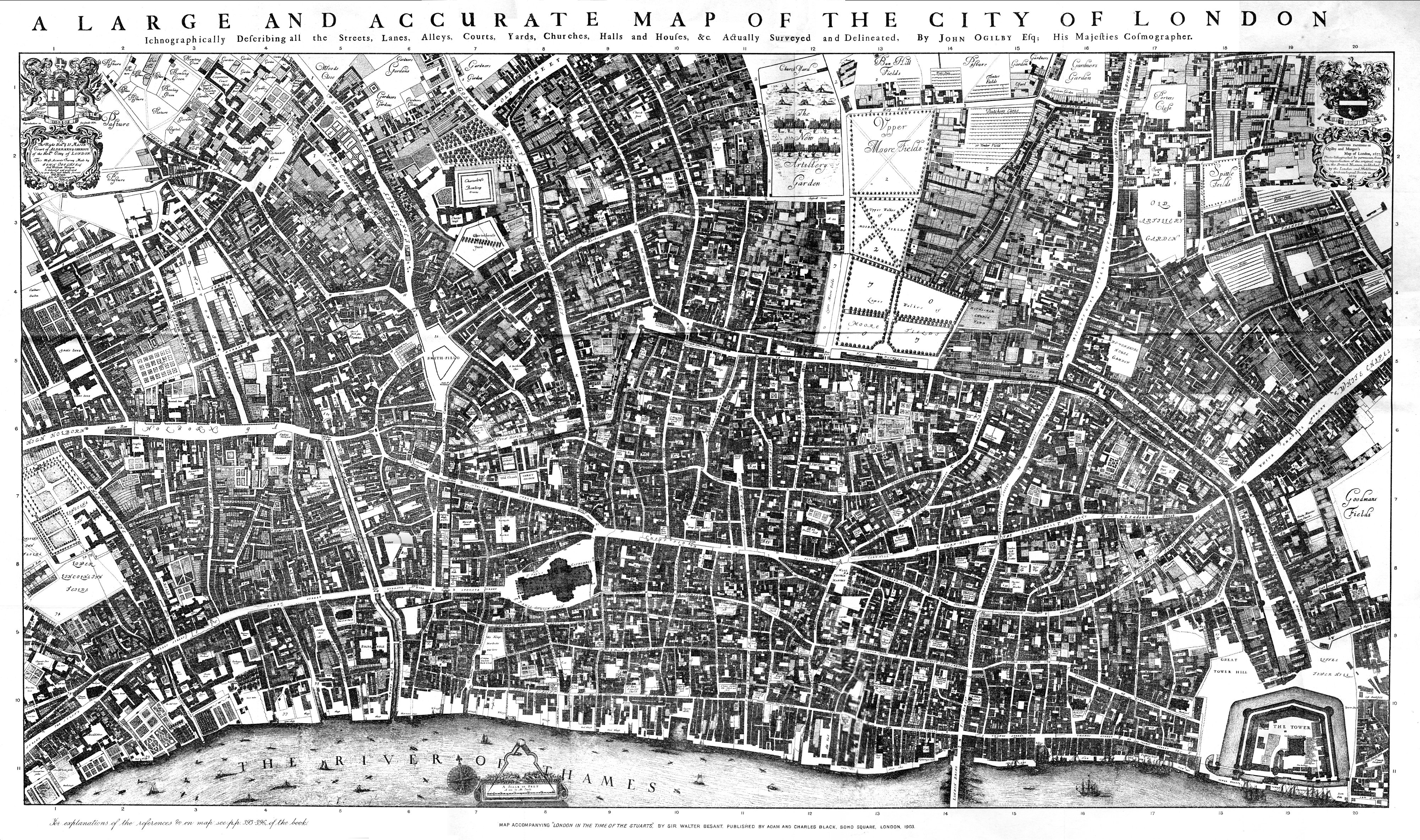
Ogilby & Morgan's 1673 map of London. The East End is developing beyond Bishopsgate and Aldgate and along the river – it is separated from the other extramural suburbs by Moorfields

The polluted nature of the area was noted by Sir William Petty in 1676, at a time when unpleasant smells were considered a vector of disease. He called for London's centre of gravity to move further west from the City towards Westminster, upwind what he called "the fumes steams and stinks of the whole easterly pyle".

In 1703 Joel Gascoyne published his map of the parish of St Dunstan Stepney, which occupied much of the East End area. He was commissioned to do so by the Vestry (local government) of the parish, who needed such a map for administrative purposes. The map shows Stepney divided into Hamlets, these were territorial sub-divisions, rather than small villages, and later became independent daughter parishes in their own right.

In 1720 John Strype gives us our first record of the East End as a distinct entity, rather than a collection of parishes, when he describes London as consisting of four parts: the City of London, Westminster, Southwark, and "That Part beyond the Tower".

The relevance of Strype's reference to the Tower was more than geographical. The East End (including the Tower and its Liberties) was the urbanised part of an administrative area called the Tower Division, which had owed military service to the Constable of the Tower (in his ex-officio role as Lord Lieutenant of the Tower Hamlets) for time immemorial, having its roots in the Bishop of London's historic Manor of Stepney. This made the Constable an influential figure in the civil and military affairs of the early East End. Later, as London grew further, the fully urbanised Tower Division became a byword for wider East London, before East London grew further still, east of the River Lea and into Essex.

The contrast between the east and west ends was stark, in 1797 the Prussian writer and historian Archenholz wrote:

(The east)...especially along the shores of the Thames, consists of old houses, the streets there are narrow, dark, and ill paved; inhabited by sailors and other workmen... and by a great part of the Jews. The contrast between this and the west is astonishing

— Johann Wilhelm von Archenholz, A Picture of England (1797)

Writing of the period around 1800, Rev. Richardson commented on the estrangements between the east and west:

The inhabitants of the extreme east of London knew nothing of the western localities and vice-versa. There was little communication or sympathy between the two ends of London. …and thus the householders of Westminster were as distinct from householders of Bishopsgate Without, Shoreditch and all those localities which stretch towards the Essex side of the city, as they are from the inhabitants of Holland or Belgium.

— Rev. J. Richardson (1856)

The East End has always contained some of London's poorest areas. The main reasons for this include:

- The medieval system of copyhold, which prevailed throughout the Manor of Stepney into the 19th century. There was little point in developing land that was held on short leases.
- The siting of noxious industries, such as tanning and fulling downwind outside the boundaries of the City, and therefore beyond complaints and official controls. The foul-smelling industries partially preferred the East End because the prevailing winds in London traveled from west to east (i.e. it was downwind from the rest of the city), so that most odours from their businesses would not go into the city.
- The low-paid employment in the docks and related industries, made worse by the trade practices of outwork, piecework and casual labour.
- The concentration of the ruling court and national political centre in Westminster, on the opposite, western side of the City of London.

In medieval times trades were carried out in workshops in and around the owners' premises in the City. By the time of the Great Fire of London in 1666 these were becoming industries, and some were particularly noisome, such as the processing of urine for the tanning industry, or required large amounts of space, such as drying clothes after process and dying in fields known as tentergrounds. Some were dangerous, such as the manufacture of gunpowder or the proving of guns. These activities came to be performed outside the City walls in the near suburbs of the East End. Later, when lead-making and bone-processing for soap and china came to be established, they too located in the East End rather than in the crowded streets of the City.

In 1817 the Lower Moorfields was built on and the gap with Finsbury was fully closed, and in the late 19th century development across the Lea in West Ham began in earnest.

As time went on, large estates began to be split up, ending the constraining effect of short-term copyhold. Estates of fine houses for captains, merchants and owners of manufacturers began to be built. Samuel Pepys moved his family and goods to Bethnal Green during the Great Fire of London, and Captain Cook moved from Shadwell to Stepney Green, where a school and assembly rooms had been established (commemorated by Assembly Passage, and a plaque on the site of Cook's house on the Mile End Road). Mile End Old Town also acquired some fine buildings, and the New Town began to be built.

By 1882, Walter Besant was able to describe East London as a city in its own right, on account of its large size and social disengagement from the rest of the capital.

=== Accelerated 19th-century development ===
As the area became built up and more crowded, the wealthy sold their plots for subdivision and moved further afield. Into the 18th and 19th centuries, there were still attempts to build fine houses, for example Tredegar Square (1830), and the open fields around Mile End New Town were used for the construction of estates of workers' cottages in 1820. This was designed in 1817 in Birmingham by Anthony Hughes and finally constructed in 1820.

Globe Town was established from 1800 to provide for the expanding population of weavers around Bethnal Green, attracted by improving prospects in silk weaving. Bethnal Green's population trebled between 1801 and 1831, with 20,000 looms being operated in people's own homes. By 1824, with restrictions on importation of French silks relaxed, up to half these looms had become idle, and prices were driven down. With many importing warehouses already established in the district, the abundance of cheap labour was turned to boot, furniture and clothing manufacture. Globe Town continued its expansion into the 1860s, long after the silk industry's decline.

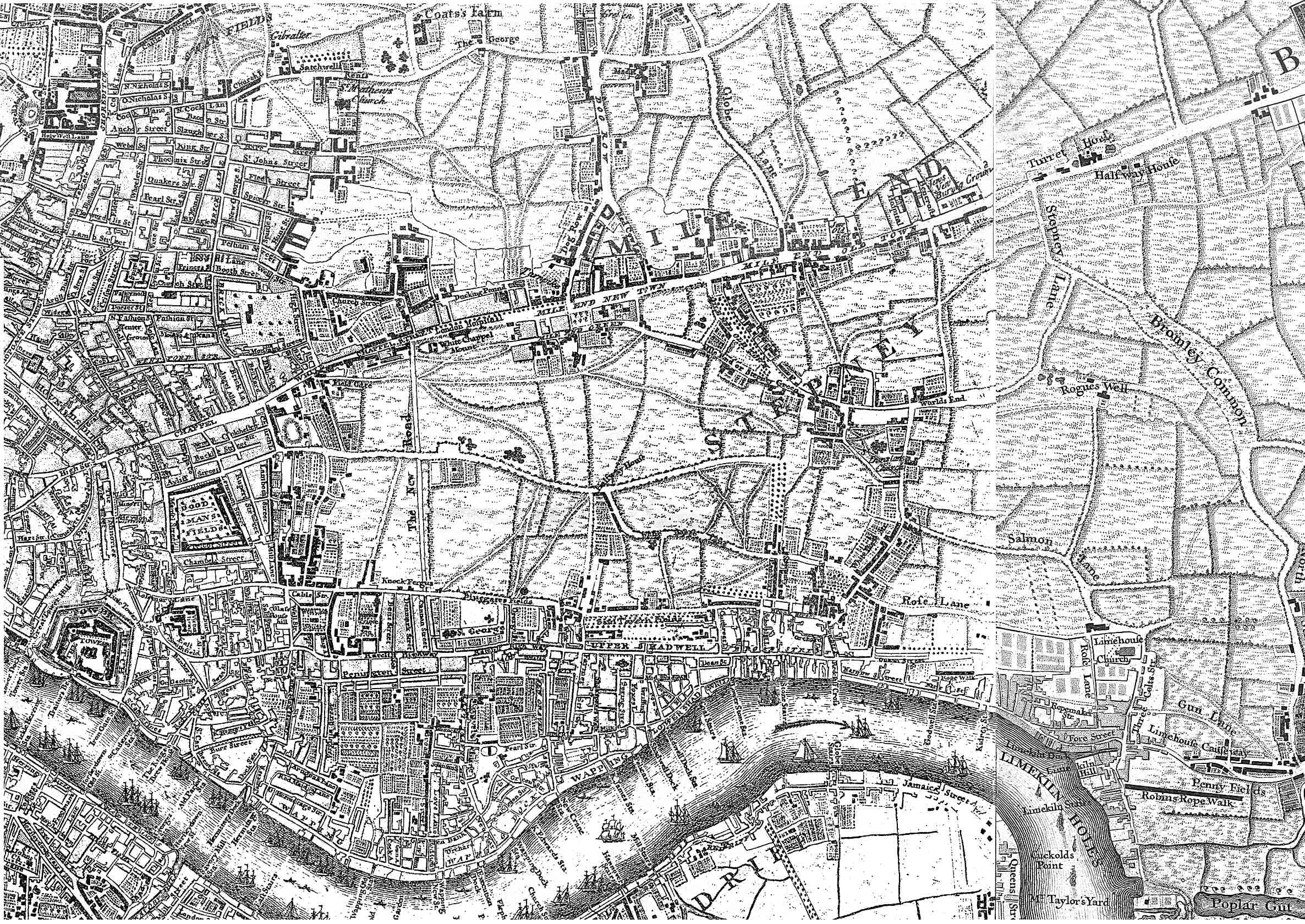
The East End in 1741–5, as depicted on John Rocque's Exact Survey of the city's of London Westminster ye Borough of Southwark and the Country near ten miles round. London is expanding, but there are still large areas of fields to the east of the City.

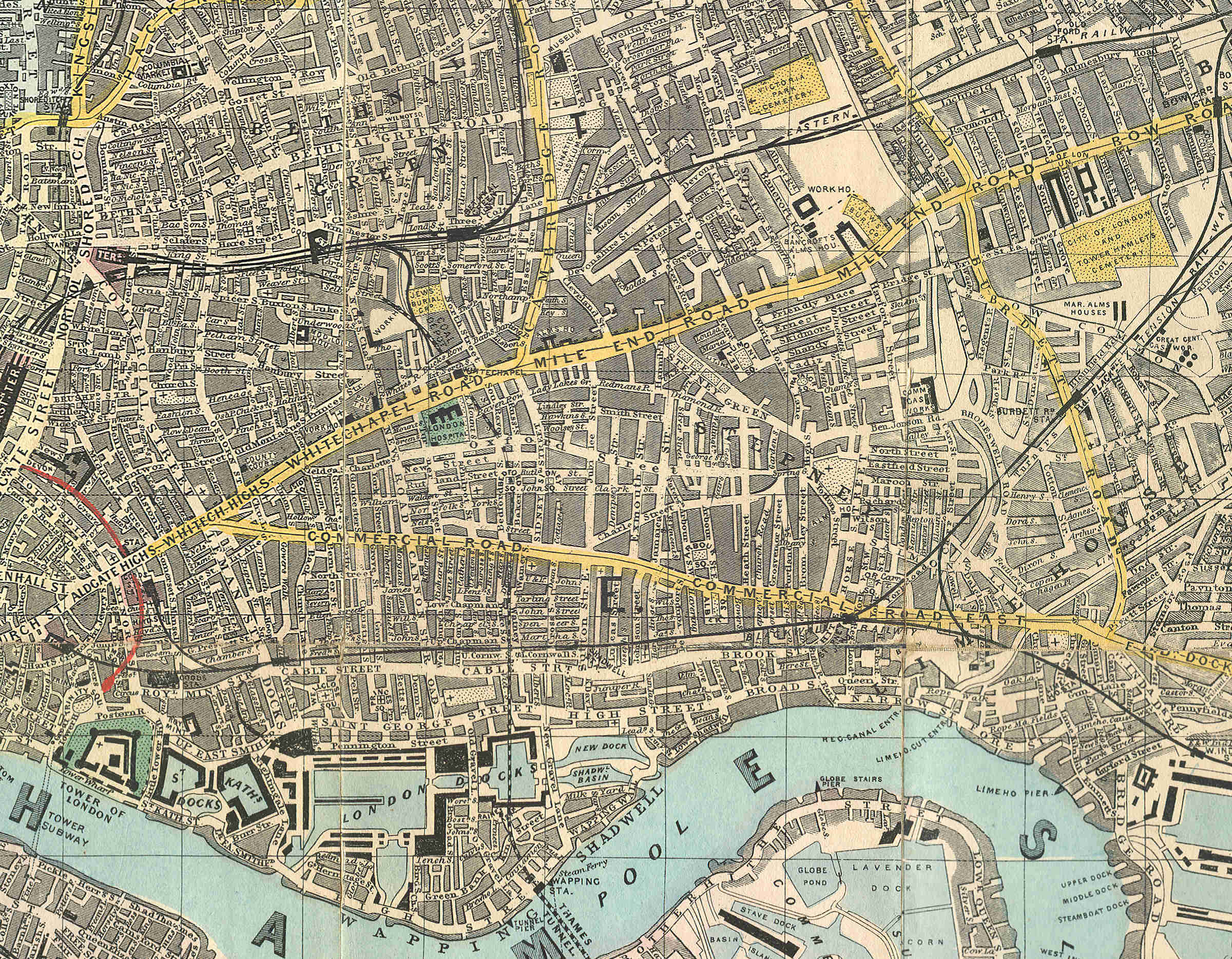
1882 Reynolds Map of the East End. Development has now eliminated the open fields shown on the earlier map.

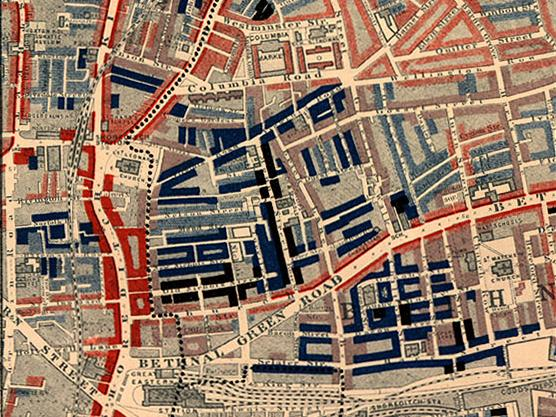
Part of Charles Booth's poverty map showing the Old Nichol slum. Published 1889 in Life and Labour of the People in London. The red areas are "middle class, well-to-do", light blue areas are "poor, 18s to 21s a week for a moderate family", dark blue areas are "very poor, casual, chronic want", and black areas are the "lowest class...occasional labourers, street sellers, loafers, criminals and semi-criminals".

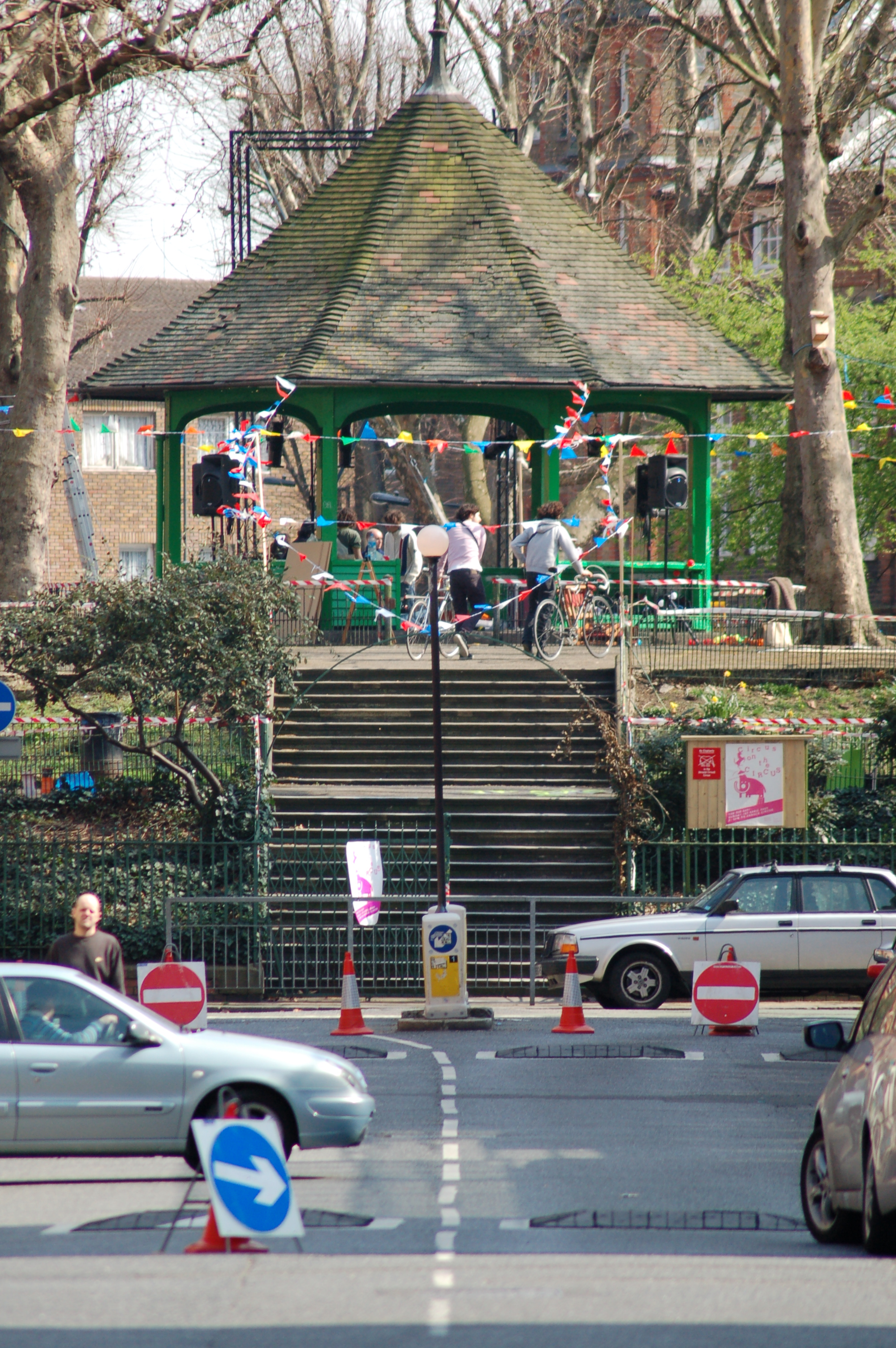
Boundary Estate bandstand was built on the rubble from the clearance of the Old Nichol slum.

During the 19th century, building on an ad hoc basis could not keep up with the expanding population's needs. Henry Mayhew visited Bethnal Green in 1850 and wrote for the Morning Chronicle, as a part of a series forming the basis for London Labour and the London Poor (1851), that the trades in the area included tailors, costermongers, shoemakers, dustmen, sawyers, carpenters, cabinet makers and silkweavers. He noted that in the area:

roads were unmade, often mere alleys, houses small and without foundations, subdivided and often around unpaved courts. An almost total lack of drainage and sewerage was made worse by the ponds formed by the excavation of brickearth. Pigs and cows in back yards, noxious trades like boiling tripe, melting tallow, or preparing cat's meat, and slaughter houses, dustheaps, and 'lakes of putrefying night soil' added to the filth

— Henry Mayhew, London Labour and London Poor (1851)

A movement began to clear the slums. Burdett-Coutts built Columbia Market in 1869 and the Artisans' and Labourers' Dwellings Improvement Act 1875 passed in 1876 to provide powers to seize slums from landlords and to provide access to public funds to build new housing. Philanthropic housing associations such as the Peabody Trust were formed to provide homes for the poor and to clear the slums generally. Expansion by the railway companies, such as the London and Blackwall Railway and Great Eastern Railway, caused large areas of slum housing to be demolished. The Housing of the Working Classes Act 1890 (53 & 54 Vict. c. 70), gave local authorities, notably London County Council, new powers and responsibilities and led to the building of new philanthropic housing such as Blackwall Buildings and Great Eastern Buildings.

By 1890, official slum clearance programmes had begun. These included the creation of the world's first council housing, the LCC Boundary Estate, which replaced the neglected and crowded streets of Friars Mount, better known as The Old Nichol Street Rookery. Between 1918 and 1939 the LCC continued replacing East End housing with five- or six-storey flats, despite residents preferring houses with gardens and opposition from shopkeepers who were forced to relocate to new, more expensive premises. The Second World War brought an end to further slum clearance.

=== Industry and innovation ===
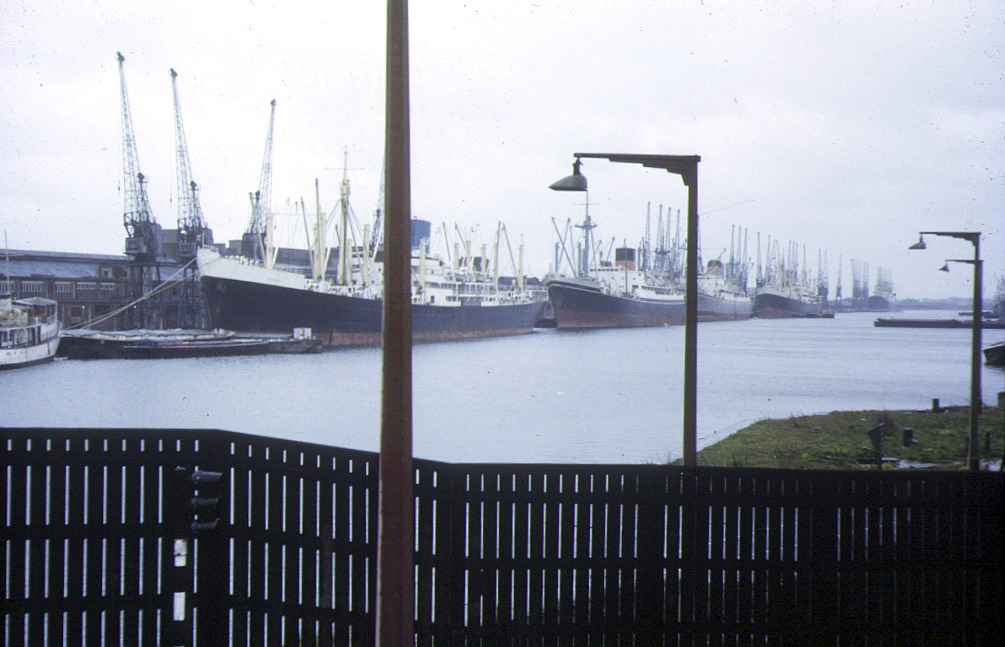
Royal Albert Dock, 1973

Industries associated with the sea developed throughout the East End, including rope making and shipbuilding. The former location of roperies can still be identified from their long straight, narrow profile in the modern streets, for instance Ropery Street near Mile End. Shipbuilding for the navy is recorded at Ratcliff in 1354, with shipfitting and repair carried out in Blackwall by 1485. On 31 January 1858, the largest ship of that time, the SS Great Eastern, designed by Isambard Kingdom Brunel, was launched from the yard of Messrs Scott Russell & Co, of Millwall. The 692 ft (211 m) vessel was too long to fit across the river, and so the ship had to be launched sideways. Due to the technical difficulties of the launch, after this, shipbuilding on the Thames went into a long decline. Ships continued to be built at the Thames Ironworks and Shipbuilding Company at Blackwall and Canning Town until the yard closed in 1913, shortly after the launch of the Dreadnought Battleship HMS Thunderer (1911).

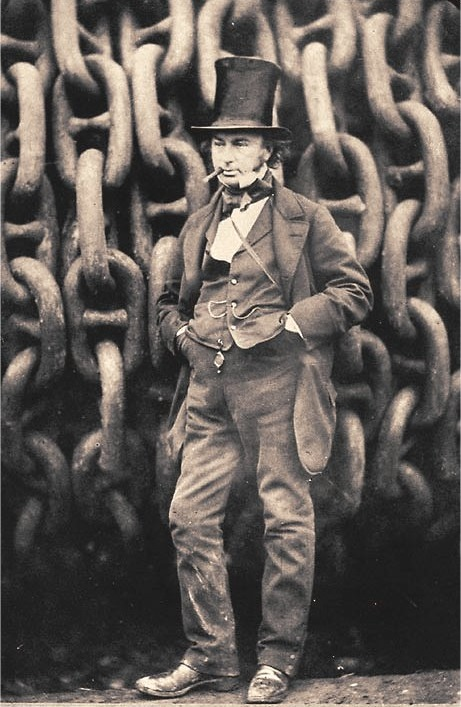
Isambard Kingdom Brunel against the launching chains of the Great Eastern at Millwall in 1857

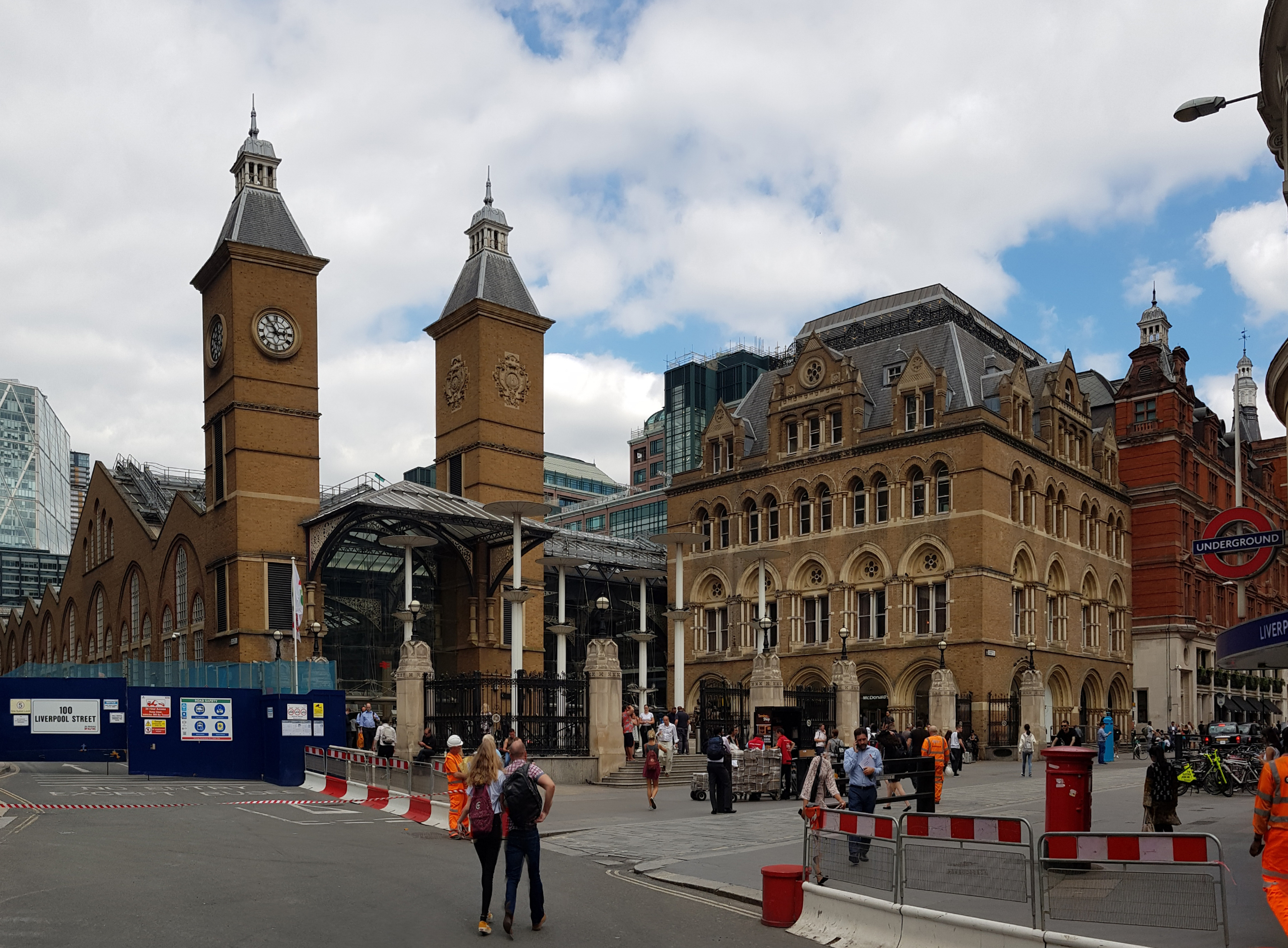
Stratford and Liverpool Street (pictured) stations, are among the busiest in the UK.

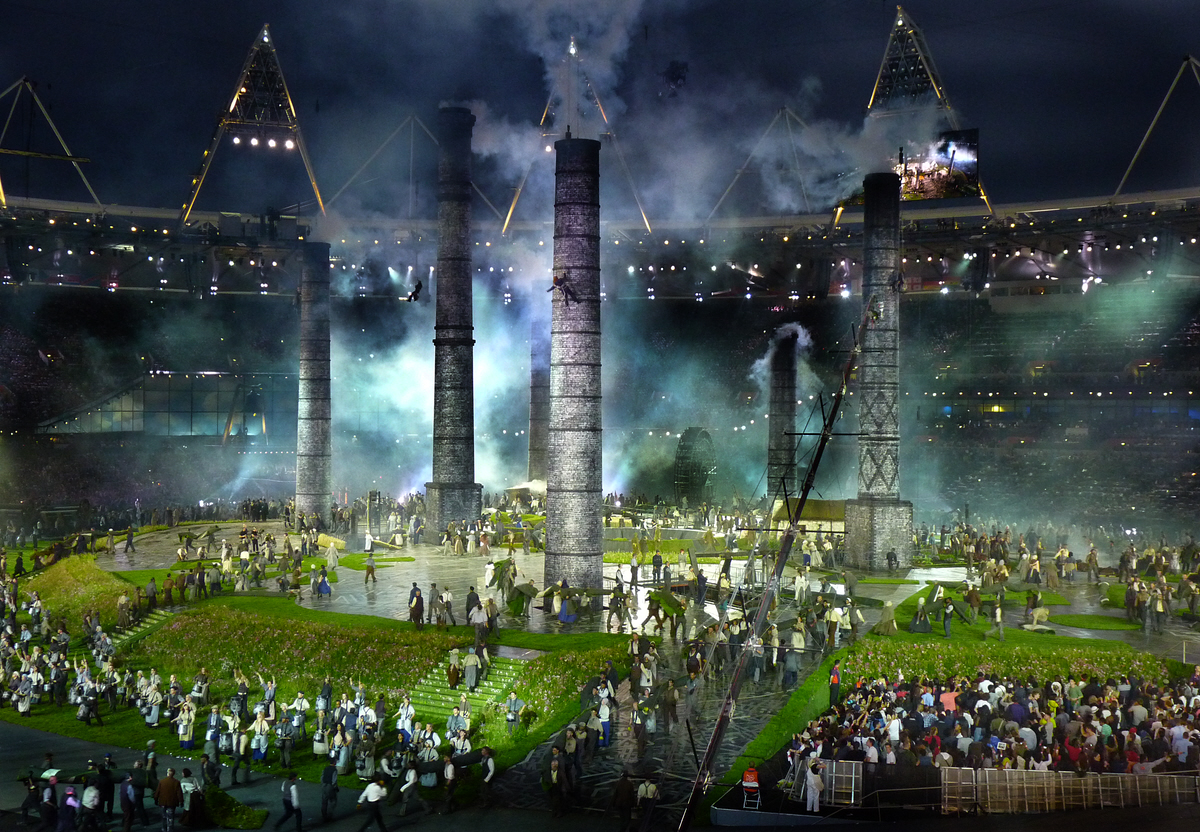
The London 2012 Opening Ceremony portrayed the trauma of the Industrial Revolution

Heading eastward from the Tower of London lie six and a half mile of former docklands; the most central of the docks – just east of the Tower, is St Katharine Docks, built in 1828 to accommodate luxury goods. This was built by clearing the slums that lay in the area of the former Hospital of St Katharine. They were not successful commercially, as they were unable to accommodate the largest ships, and in 1864, management of the docks was amalgamated with that of the London Docks.

The London Docks were built in 1805, and the waste soil and rubble from the construction was carried by barge to west London, to build up the marshy area of Pimlico. These docks imported tobacco, wine, wool and other goods into guarded warehouses within high walls (some of which still remain). They were able to berth over 300 sailing vessels simultaneously, but by 1971 they closed, no longer able to accommodate modern shipping.

The West India Docks were established in 1803, providing berths for larger ships and a model for future London dock building. Imported produce from the West Indies was unloaded directly into quayside warehouses. Ships were limited to 6000 tons. The old Brunswick Dock, a shipyard at Blackwall became the basis for the East India Company's East India Docks established there in 1806. The Millwall Docks were created in 1868, predominantly for the import of grain and timber. These docks housed the first purpose built granary for the Baltic grain market, a local landmark that remained until it was demolished to improve access for the London City Airport.

The first railway (the "Commercial Railway") to be built, in 1840, was a passenger service based on cable haulage by stationary steam engines that ran the 3.5 mi (5.6 km) from Minories to Blackwall on a pair of tracks. It required 14 mi (22.5 km) of hemp rope, and "dropped" carriages as it arrived at stations, which were reattached to the cable for the return journey, the train "reassembling" itself at the terminus. The line was converted to standard gauge in 1859, and steam locomotives adopted. The building of London termini at Fenchurch Street (1841), and Bishopsgate (1840) provided access to new suburbs across the River Lea, again resulting in the destruction of housing and increased overcrowding in the slums. After the opening of Liverpool Street station (1874), Bishopsgate railway station became a goods yard, in 1881, to bring imports from Eastern ports. With the introduction of containerisation, the station declined, suffered a fire in 1964 that destroyed the station buildings, and it was finally demolished in 2004 for the extension of the East London Line. In the 19th century, the area north of Bow Road became a major railway centre for the North London Railway, with marshalling yards and a maintenance depot serving both the City and the West India docks. Nearby Bow railway station opened in 1850 and was rebuilt in 1870 in a grand style, featuring a concert hall. The line and yards closed in 1944, after severe bomb damage, and never reopened, as goods became less significant, and cheaper facilities were concentrated in Essex.

The River Lea was a constraint to eastward expansion, but the Metropolitan Buildings Act 1844 led to growth over that river into West Ham. The act restricted the operation of dangerous and noxious industries from in the metropolitan area, the eastern boundary of which was the Lea. Consequently, many of these activities were relocated to the banks of the river. The building of the Royal Docks consisting of the Royal Victoria Dock (1855), able to berth vessels of up to 8000 tons; Royal Albert Dock (1880), up to 12,000 tons; and King George V Dock (1921), up to 30,000 tons, on the estuary marshes helped extend the continuous development of London across the Lea into Essex. The railways gave access to a passenger terminal at Gallions Reach and new suburbs created in West Ham, which quickly became a major manufacturing town, with 30,000 houses built between 1871 and 1901. Soon afterwards, East Ham was built up to serve the new Gas Light and Coke Company and Joseph Bazalgette's grand sewage works at Beckton.

The years 1885–1909 saw a series of transportation milestones achieved in Walthamstow. In 1885, John Kemp Starley designed the first modern bicycle, while in 1892 Frederick Bremer built the first British motorcar in a workshop in his garden. The London General Omnibus Company built the first mass-produced buses there, the B-type from 1908 onwards and in 1909, A. V. Roe successfully tested the first all-British aeroplane on Walthamstow Marshes.

=== Decline and regeneration ===
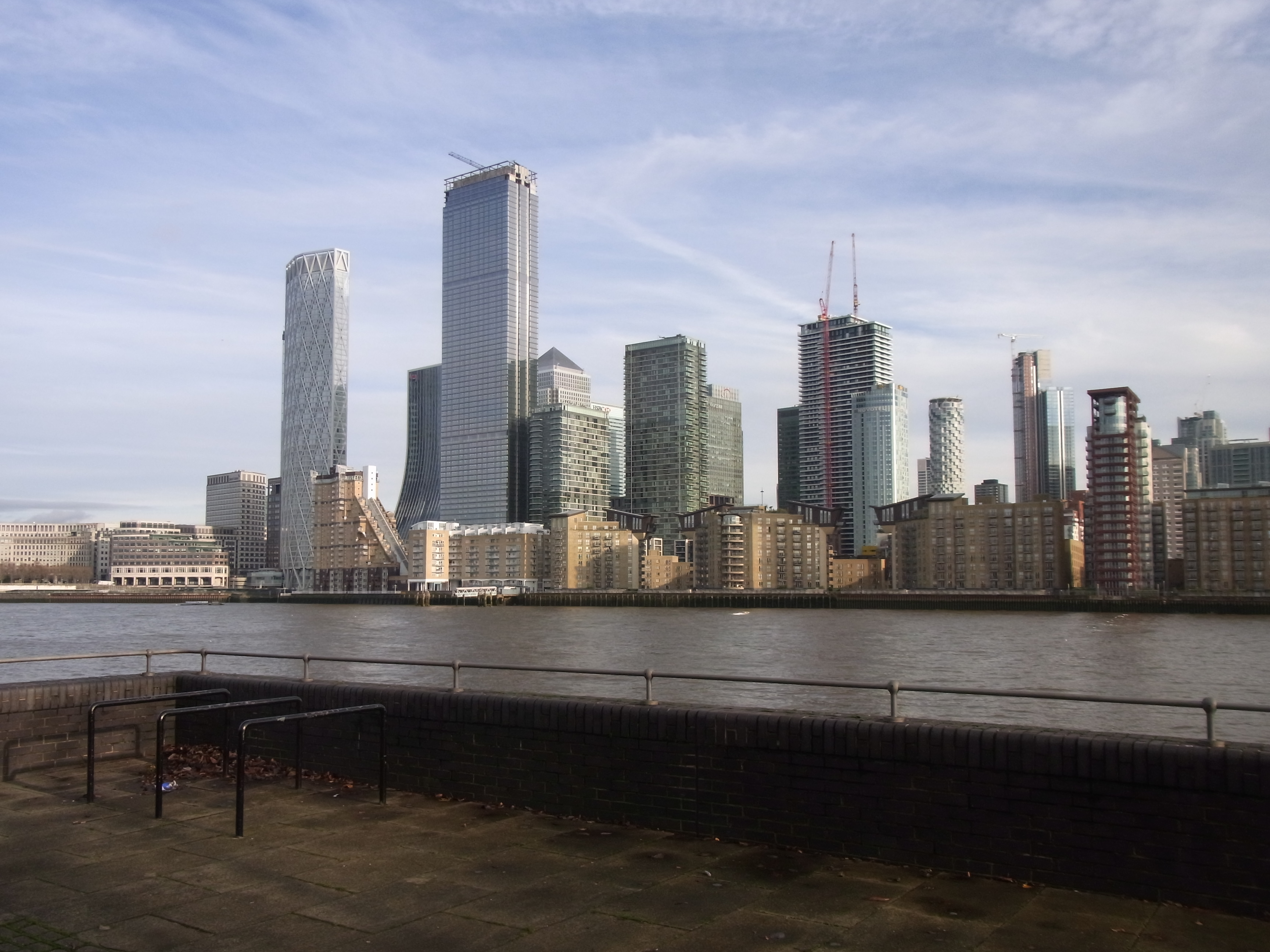
Redevelopment on the Isle of Dogs

The East End has historically suffered from poor housing stock and infrastructure. From the 1950s, the area was a microcosm of the structural and social changes affecting the UK economy. The closure of docks, cutbacks in railways and loss of industry contributed to a long-term decline, removing many of the traditional sources of low- and semi-skilled jobs.

The docks declined from the mid-20th century, with the last, the Royal Docks, closing in 1980. Various wharves along the river continue to be used but on a much smaller scale. London's main port facilities are now at Tilbury and London Gateway (opened in 1886 and 2013 respectively), further downstream, beyond the Greater London boundary in Essex. These larger modern facilities can accommodate larger vessels and are suitable for the needs of modern container ships.

There has been extensive regeneration, and the East End has become a desirable place for business, partly due to the availability of brownfield land. Much of this development has been of little benefit to local communities and has caused a damaging rise in property prices, meaning that much of the area remains among the poorest in Britain.

==== Housing ====
The area had one of the highest concentrations of council housing, the legacy of slum clearance and wartime destruction. Many of the 1960s tower blocks have been demolished or renovated, replaced by low-rise housing, often in private ownership, or owned by housing associations.

==== Transport improvements ====
By the mid-1980s, the District line (extended to the East End in 1884 and 1902) and Central line (1946) were beyond capacity, and the Docklands Light Railway (1987) and Jubilee line (1999) were subsequently constructed to improve rail transport in the area.

There was a long-standing plan to provide London with an inner motorway box, the East Cross Route, but only a short section was built. Road links were improved by the completion of the Limehouse Link tunnel under Limehouse Basin in 1993 and the extension of the A12 to connect to the Blackwall Tunnel in the 1990s. The extension of the East London line provided further improvements in 2010. From 2021, the Elizabeth line will create an east–west service across London, with a major interchange at Whitechapel. New river crossings are planned at Beckton, (the Thames Gateway Bridge) and at the proposed Silvertown Link road tunnel, intended to supplement the existing Blackwall Tunnel.

==== City fringe regeneration ====
The continued strength of the City's financial services sector has seen many large office buildings erected around the City fringe, with indirect benefits accruing to local business. The area around Old Spitalfields Market has been redeveloped and Brick Lane, dubbed London's curry capital, or Bangla Town, has benefited from the City's success.

Art galleries have flourished, including the expanded Whitechapel Gallery and the workshop of artists Gilbert and George in Spitalfields. The neighbourhood around Hoxton Square has become a centre for modern British art, including the White Cube gallery, with many artists from the Young British Artists movement living and working in the area. This has made the area around Hoxton and Shoreditch fashionable, a busy nightlife has developed, but many former residents now driven out by higher property prices and gentrification.

East London Tech City, a cluster of technology companies has developed in and around Shoreditch, and the Queen Mary University of London has expanded its existing site at Mile End, and opened specialist medical campuses at the Royal London Hospital and Whitechapel.

==== Regeneration at Canary Wharf and docklands ====
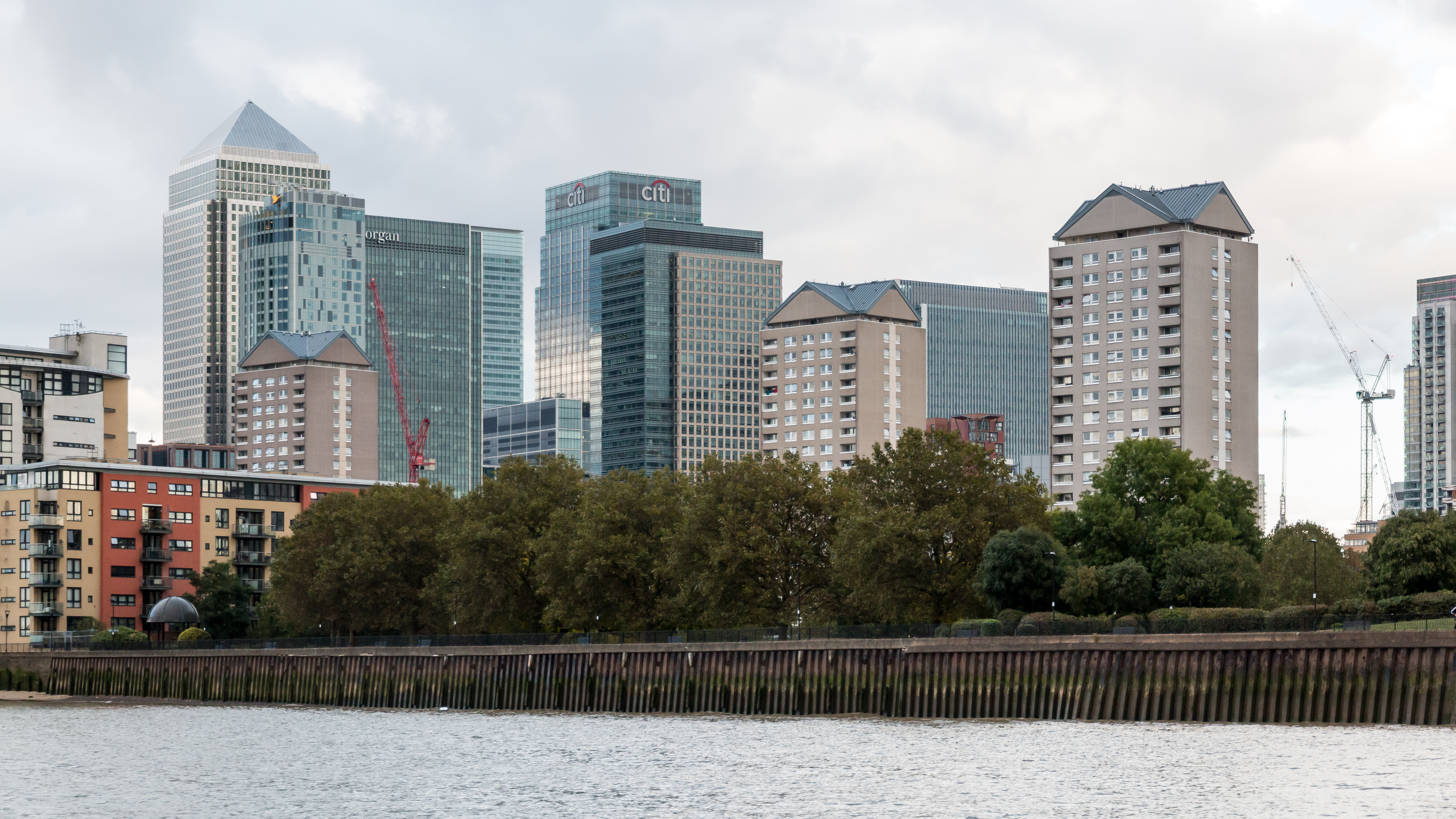
Canary Wharf (view from the Thames, 2016)

The devastating closure of the docks and the loss of the associated industries led to the establishment of the London Docklands Development Corporation, which operated from 1981 to 1998; the body was charged with using deregulation and other levers to stimulate economic regeneration.

As a consequence of this, and of investment in the area's transport infrastructure, there have been many urban renewal projects, most notably Canary Wharf, a huge commercial and housing development on the Isle of Dogs. Another major development is London City Airport, built in 1986, in the former King George V Dock to provide short-haul services to domestic and European destinations. There has been extensive building of luxury apartments, mainly around the former dock areas and alongside the Thames.

The Docklands regeneration has been a success, but being based on service industries, the work does not closely match the skills and needs of the dockland communities.

==== Regeneration around Stratford ====
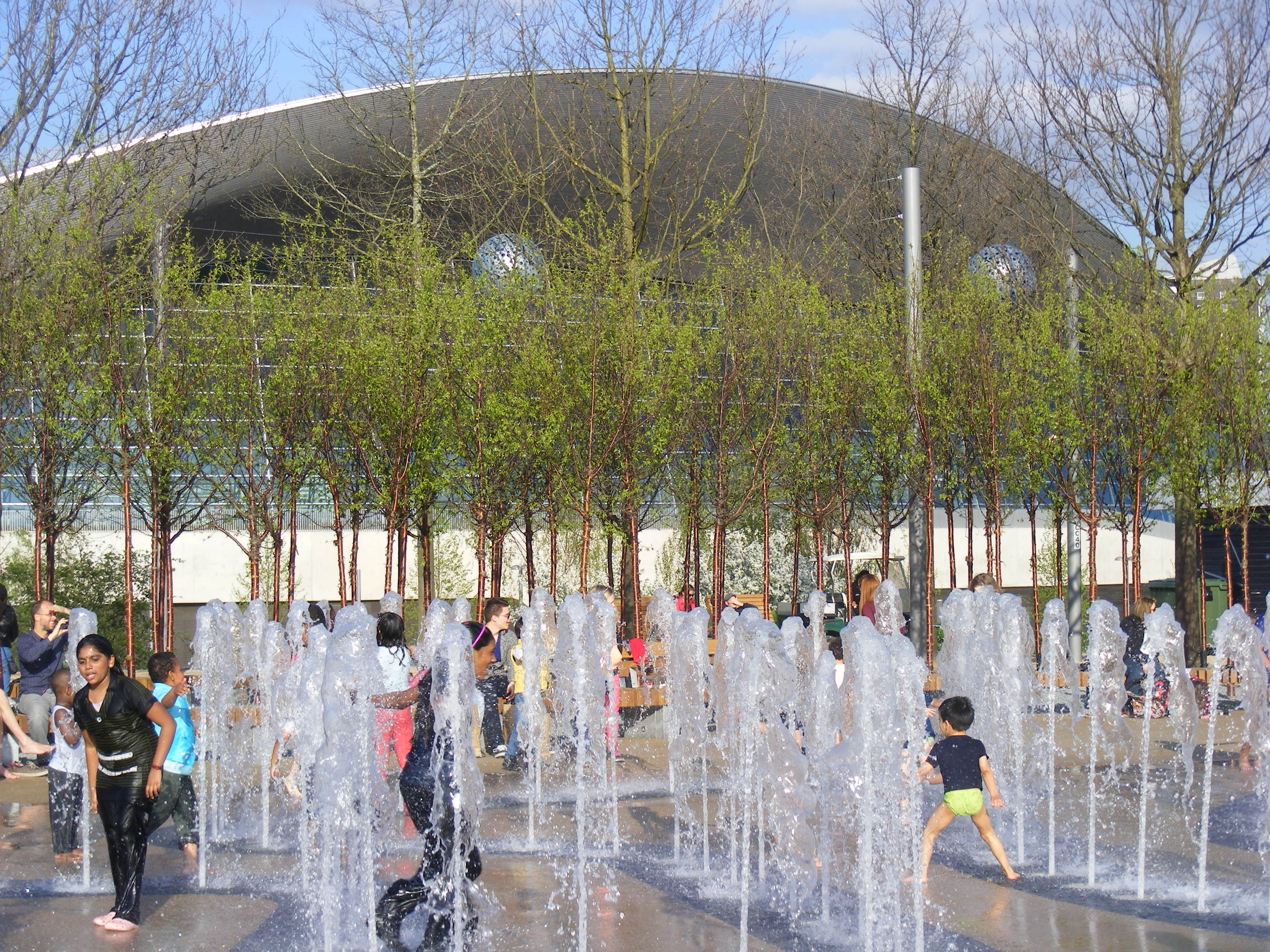
Queen Elizabeth Olympic Park, 2014

The 2012 Summer Olympics and Paralympics were held in the Olympic Park, created on former industrial land around the River Lea. The park includes a legacy of new sports facilities, housing, industrial and technical infrastructure intended to further regenerate the area. Other developments at Stratford include Stratford International station and the Stratford City development. Nearby, the University of East London developed a new campus and many more cultural and educational facilities are being developed in the Olympic Park.

== People ==
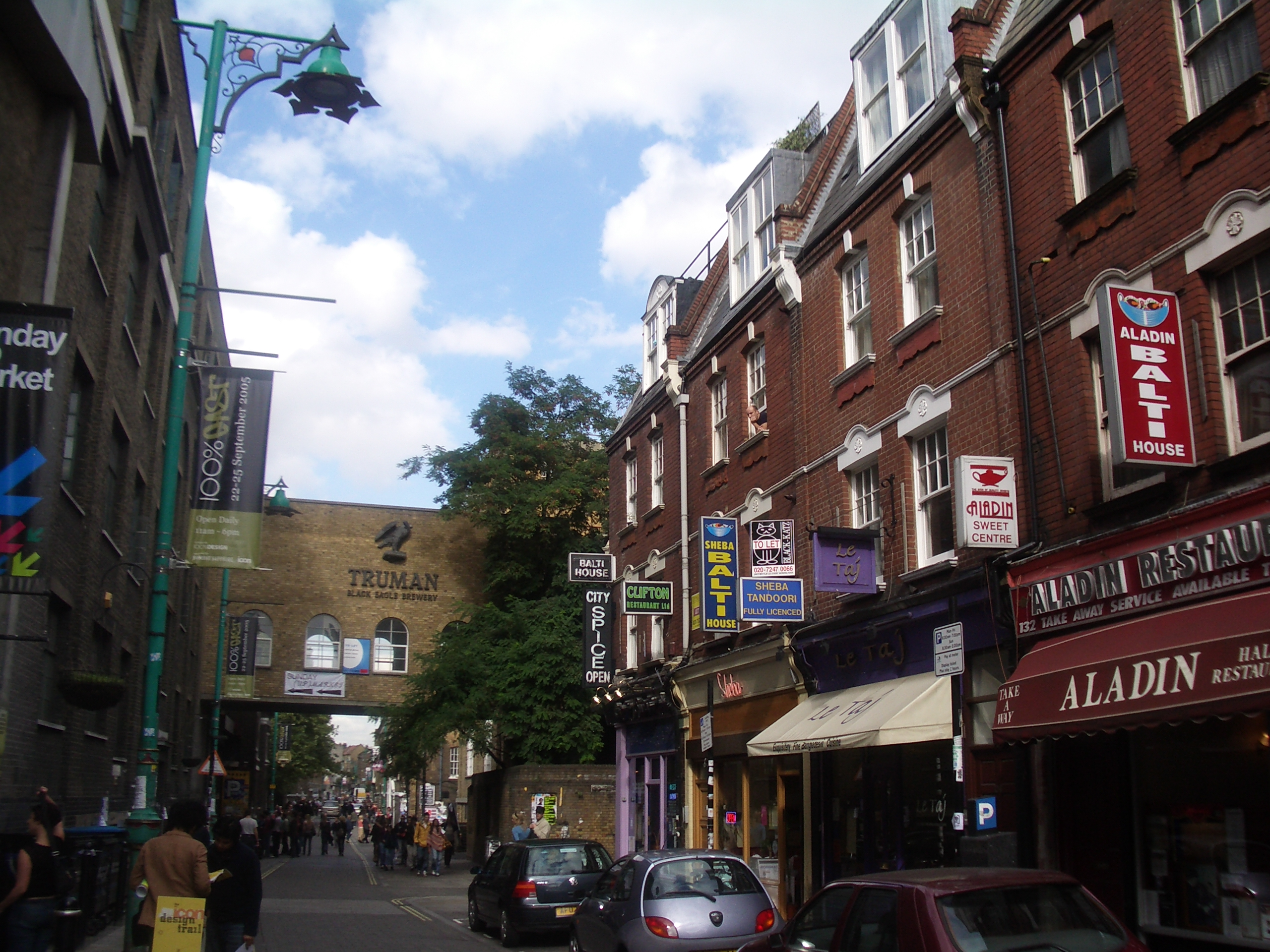
Brick Lane has been a centre for new immigration through the centuries

Historically, the high death rates experienced in cities has meant they needed inward migration to maintain their level of population. Inward migration has maintained and increased the area's large population, which has in turn become a source of people moving to settle in other areas.

=== Inward migration ===
The influence of the traditional Essex dialect on Cockney speech suggests that a high proportion of early Londoners came from Essex and areas speaking related eastern dialects. Migrants from all over the British Isles have made the East End their home, and migration from overseas has also always been a significant source of new East Enders. As early as 1483, the Portsoken is recorded as having more aliens in its population than any ward in the City of London.

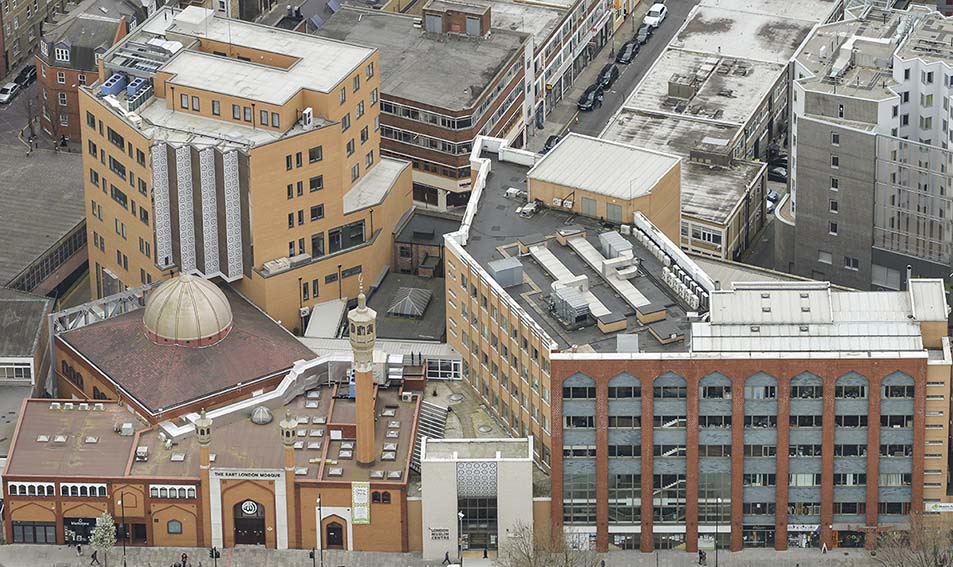
The East London Mosque was one of the first in Britain to be allowed to use loudspeakers to broadcast the adhan.

Immigrant communities developed primarily along the river. From the Tudor era until the 20th century, ships' crews were employed on a casual basis. New and replacement crew would be found wherever they were available, local sailors being particularly prized for their knowledge of currents and hazards in foreign ports. Crews were paid at the end of their voyages. Inevitably, permanent communities became established, including small numbers of lascars from the Indian subcontinent and Africans from the Guinea Coast. Chinatowns in both Shadwell and Limehouse sprang up in response to Chinese emigration to London, where they opened and operated opium dens, brothels and laundries. It was only after the devastation of the Second World War that this predominantly Han Chinese community relocated to Soho.

Weaving was a major industry in areas close to the City but remote from the Thames; the arrival of Huguenot (French Protestant) refugees, many of them weavers, alongside large numbers of their English and Irish counterparts contributed to rapid development in Spitalfields and western Bethnal Green in the 17th century.

In 1786, the Committee for the Relief of the Black Poor was formed by British citizens concerned for the welfare of London's "black poor", many of whom had been evacuated from the thirteen American colonies and were former slaves who had escaped their American masters and fought on the side of the British in the American War of Independence. Others were discharged sailors and freed slaves who had been brought over from British colonies in the West Indies. The committee distributed food, clothing, and medical aid and found work for men, from various locations including the White Raven tavern in Mile End. They also helped the men to go abroad, some to Canada. In October 1786, the Committee funded an expedition of 280 black men, 40 black women and 70 white women (mainly wives and girlfriends) to settle in the Province of Freedom in west Africa. The settlers suffered tremendous hardships and many died, but the Province of Freedom proved to be a major milestone in the establishment of Sierra Leone. From the late 19th century, a large African mariner community was established in Canning Town as a result of new shipping links to the Caribbean and West Africa.

In 1655 Cromwell agreed to allow the resettlement of Jews in England, previously banished by Edward I in the 13th century, and East London became the major centre of Jews in England. In 1860, the Jews of the East End formed the East Metropolitan Rifle Volunteers (11th Tower Hamlets), a short-lived reserve unit of the British Army.

In the 1870s and 1880s, the massive increase in the number of Jewish émigrés arriving led to over 150 synagogues being built. Today three active synagogues remain in Tower Hamlets: the Congregation of Jacob Synagogue (1903 – Kehillas Ya'akov), the East London Central Synagogue (1922) and Sandys Row Synagogue (1766). Jewish immigration to the East End peaked in the 1890s, leading to agitation which resulted in the Aliens Act 1905, which slowed immigration to the area. In the mid and late 20th century many of the area's Jews migrated to more prosperous areas in the eastern suburbs and north London.

From the late 1950s the local Muslim population began to increase due to further immigration from the Indian subcontinent, particularly from Sylhet in East Pakistan, which became a part of Bangladesh in 1971. The migrants settled in areas already established by the Bengali expatriate community, working in the local docks and Jewish tailoring shops set up to use cotton produced in British India. During the 1970s, this immigration increased significantly. Today, Bangladeshis form the largest minority population in Tower Hamlets, constituting 32% of the borough's population at the 2011 census; the largest such community in Britain. The contribution of Bangladeshi people to the culture of Britain was recognised in 1998, when Pola Uddin, Baroness Uddin of Bethnal Green became the first Bangladeshi-born Briton to enter the House of Lords and the first Muslim peer to swear her oath of allegiance in the name of her own faith.

At the beginning of the 20th century, London was the capital of the British Empire, which contained tens of millions of Muslims, but London had no mosque. From 1910 to 1940 various rooms had been hired for Jumu'ah prayers on Fridays and in 1940, three houses were purchased on Commercial Road, becoming the East London Mosque and Islamic Culture Centre the following year. In 1985 the mosque was moved to a new purpose-built building on Whitechapel Road. Currently, the mosque has a capacity of 7,000, with prayer areas for men and women and classroom space for supplementary education.

Immigrants and minorities have occasionally been faced with hostility. The anti-Catholic Gordon Riots of 1780 began with burnings of the houses of Catholics and their chapels in Poplar and Spitalfields.

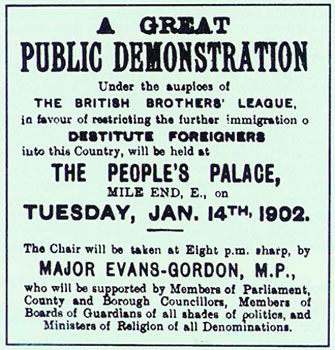
Anti-immigration poster, from 1902

In the 1900 General Election Major Evans-Gordon became the Conservative MP for Stepney on a platform of limiting immigration, winning the seat from the Liberal party. In 1901, Captain William Stanley Shaw and he formed the British Brothers' League which conducted xenophobic agitation against immigrants in the East End, with Jews eventually becoming the main focus. In Parliament in 1902, Evans-Gordon claimed that "not a day passes but English families are ruthlessly turned out to make room for foreign invaders. The rates are burdened with the education of thousands of foreign children." The campaign led to the Aliens Act 1905, which gave the Home Secretary powers to regulate and control immigration.

On 4 October 1936, around 3–5,000 uniformed blackshirts from the British Union of Fascists, led by Oswald Mosley and inspired by German and Italian fascism, assembled to begin an anti-semitic march through the East End. Around 100,000 - 350,000 East Londoners turned out to oppose them, resulting in three-way clashes between the fascists, their anti-fascist opponents and the police. There were clashes at Tower Hill, the Minories, Gardiners Corner (the junction of Whitechapel High Street and Commercial Street) and most famously at Cable Street. These engagements, together known as the Battle of Cable Street, forced the fascists to abandon their march, and conduct a parade in the West End instead.

In the mid-1970s, so-called "Paki-bashing" culminated in the murder of 25-year-old clothing worker Altab Ali by three white teenagers in a racially motivated attack. British Bangladeshi groups mobilised for self-defence, 7,000 people marched to Hyde Park in protest, and the community became more politically involved. In 1998, the former churchyard of St Mary's Whitechapel, near where the attack took place, was renamed "Altab Ali Park" in commemoration. Racially-motivated violence has continued to occasionally occur, and in 1993 the British National Party won a council seat (which they have since lost). A 1999 bombing in Brick Lane was part of a series that targeted ethnic minorities, gays and "multiculturalists".

=== Outward migration: the Cockney diaspora ===
As London extended east, East Enders often moved to opportunities in the new suburbs. The late 19th century saw a major movement of people to West Ham and East Ham to service the new docks and industries established there.

There was significant work to alleviate overcrowded housing from the start of the 20th century under the London County Council. Between the wars, people moved to new estates built for this purpose, in particular at Becontree and Harold Hill, or out of London entirely.

The Second World War devastated much of the East End, with its docks, railways and industry forming a continual target for bombing, especially during the Blitz, leading to dispersal of the population to new suburbs and new housing being built in the 1950s. Many East Enders went further than the eastern suburbs, leaving London altogether, notably to the Essex new towns of Basildon and Harlow, the Hertfordshire town of Hemel Hempstead and elsewhere.

The resulting depopulation accelerated after the Second World War and has only recently begun to reverse, though the Bangladeshi community, now the largest in Tower Hamlets and established East Enders, are beginning to migrate to the eastern suburbs. This reflects improved economic circumstances and in this, the latest group of migrants are following a pattern established for over more than three centuries.

These population figures reflect the area that now forms the London Borough of Tower Hamlets only:

Borough	1811	1841	1871	1901	1931	1961	1971	1991	2001	2011
Bethnal Green	33,619	74,088	120,104	129,680	108,194	47,078	n/a	n/a	n/a	n/a
Poplar	13,548	31,122	116,376	168,882	155,089	66,604	n/a	n/a	n/a	n/a
Stepney	131,606	203,802	275,467	298,600	225,238	92,000	n/a	n/a	n/a	n/a
Total	178,773	309,012	511,947	597,102	488,611	205,682	169,626	161,064	196,106	254,100

By comparison, in 1801 the population of England and Wales was 9 million; by 1851 it had more than doubled to 18 million, and by the end of the century had reached 40 million.

== Culture and community ==
=== Cockney identity ===
Despite a negative image among outsiders, the people of the area take pride in the East End and in their Cockney identity. The term Cockney has loose geographic and linguistic definitions with blurring between the two. In practice people from all over the East End, the wider East London area and beyond (the dispersal of East Londoners is known as Cockney Diaspora), identify as Cockneys; including people who use the Cockney dialect and some that don't.

A traditional definition is that to be a Cockney, one had to be born within the sound of Bow Bells, situated on Cheapside. The eastern topography is mostly low lying, a factor which combines with the strength and regularity of the prevailing wind, blowing from west-south-west for three quarters of the year, to carry the sound further to the east, and more often. In the 19th century the sound would have been heard as far away as Stamford Hill, Leyton and Stratford, but modern noise pollution means that the bells can only be heard as far as Shoreditch.

The Cockney dialect has lexical borrowings from Yiddish, Romani, and costermonger slang, and a distinctive accent that includes T-glottalization, a loss of dental fricatives, diphthong alterations, the use of rhyming slang and other features. The accent is said to be a remnant of early English London speech, strongly influenced by the traditional Essex dialect, and modified by the many immigrants to the area. Cockney English is spoken widely in the East End, other areas of East London and in many traditionally working-class areas across London.

The position of the Cockney dialect in London has been weakened by the promotion of Received Pronunciation (RP) in the 20th century, and by the scale of migration to London. This has included both gentrifying domestic migration (RP speakers) and the scale of international migration. Conversely, out-migration from East London has spread the Cockney dialect beyond the capital.

The Cockney dialect taken beyond London is sometimes referred to as Estuary English, heavily influenced by Cockney and named after the Thames Estuary area where the movement of East Londoners to south Essex and to a lesser extent parts on north Kent led it to be most widely spoken. Within London Cockney speech is, to a significant degree, being replaced by Multicultural London English, a form of speech with a significant Cockney influence.

By tradition any child born at sea was considered a parishioner of Stepney (the parish covered most of the East End at one time), and could claim Poor Relief there. They might, by extension, also be called an East-ender. The maritime association is remembered in the old rhyme:

He who sails on the wide sea, is a parishioner of Stepney

=== Bells ===
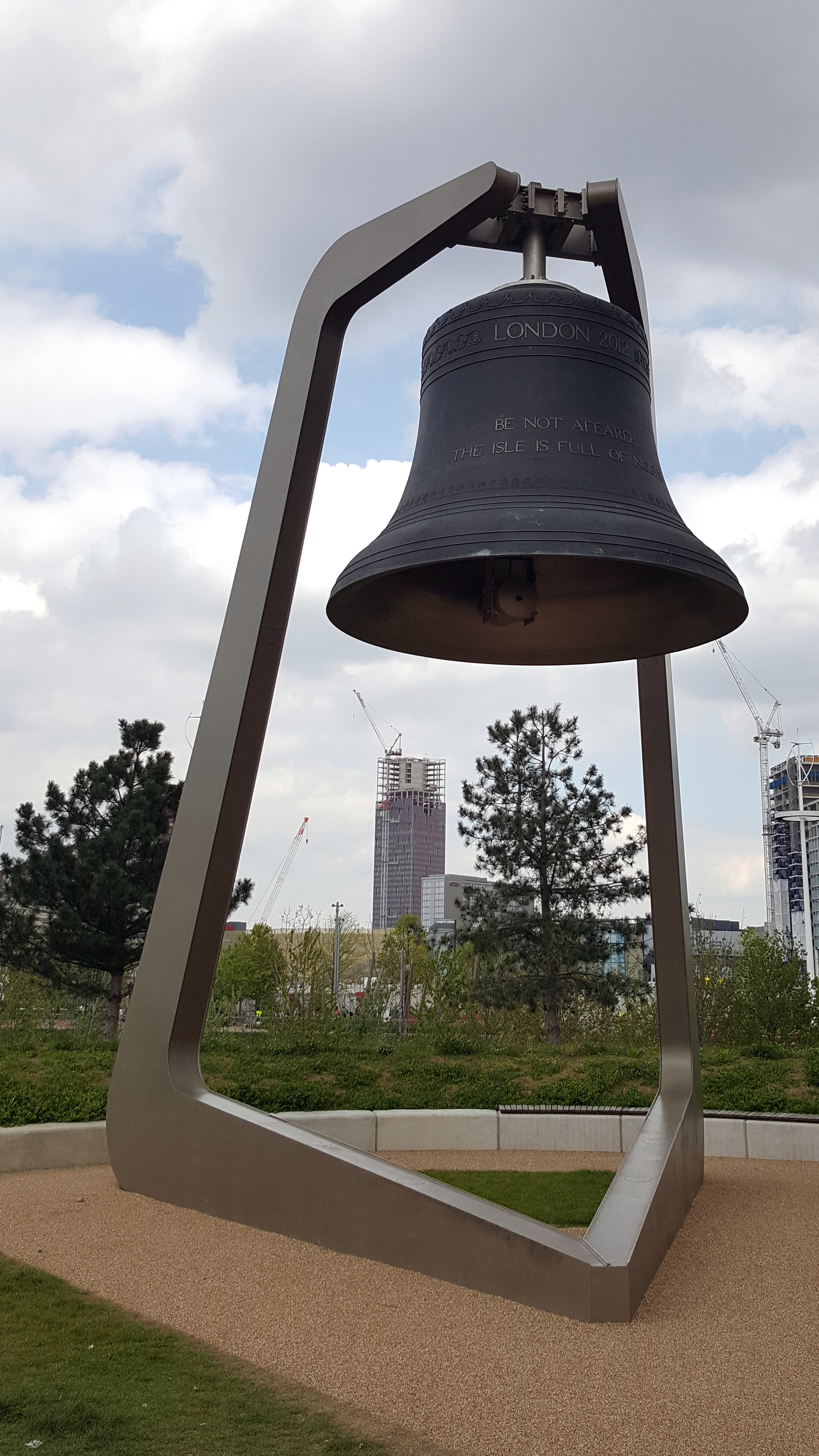
The Olympic Bell, at the London Stadium, close to the East End.

In 1360, Geoffrey Chaucer, then living in the City Wall's Aldgate gatehouse, recorded a pre-existing bell-founding industry, outside the wall in the Aldgate/Whitechapel area.

Two of the six sets of bells featured in the Nursery rhyme Oranges and Lemons are in the East End (Whitechapel and Shoreditch), as well as that symbol of the East End – Bow Bells (at St Mary-le-Bow on Cheapside, within the former walls and therefore outside of the East End). Older versions of the rhyme include the bells at Aldgate, though this may instead reference the bell founding industry in that area. The Shoreditch bells that feature in the rhyme are used to represent Shoreditch in the Coat of arms of the London Borough of Hackney.

The Whitechapel Bell Foundry opened in 1570, and until its closure in 2016 was the oldest manufacturing company in the UK. The foundry built many of the most famous bells in the world including Big Ben, the Liberty Bell in Philadelphia and Bow Bells. Other Whitechapel cast bells of local significance include St Dunstan's in Stepney, and the parish churches of West Ham and Hackney. The Olympic Bell at the London Stadium – the largest harmonically tuned bell in the world and used in the opening ceremony of the 2012 games was jointly developed by Whitechapel, in partnership with a Dutch foundry.

=== St Dunstan and Stepney ===
Dunstan was a tenth century churchman, statesman and saint with strong links to the East End area. As Bishop of London he was also the Lord of the Manor of Stepney, an estate that included most or all of what would become the East End, and like subsequent bishops may have lived in the manor. The extent of the manor, and the association with the Tower means the Tower division, also known as the Tower Hamlets may have been based on Stepney.

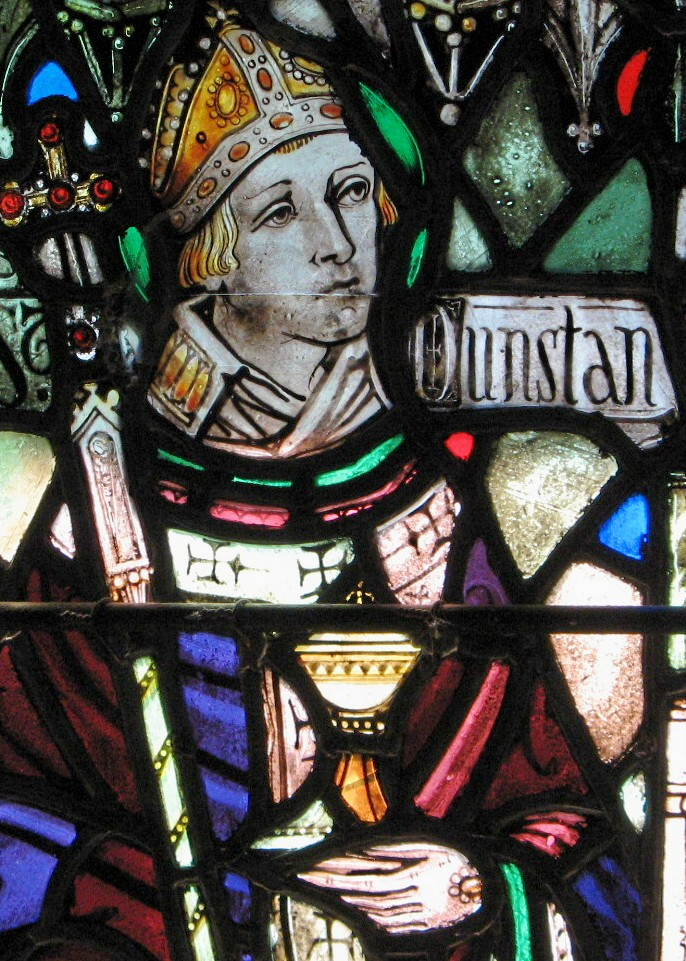
Dunstan was a 10th-century English saint closely linked to the East End.

In 952, Dunstan is recorded as founding (or more likely rebuilding) St Dunstan's Church in Stepney. This was initially the only church for the Parish of Stepney which, like the manor, originally included much or all of the East End area, with daughter parishes forming much later as a result of population growth. For this reason, St Dunstan's is known as The Mother Church of the East End (not to be confused with St Mark's in Dalston, known as the Cathedral of the East End due to its size). As patron of Stepney, Dunstan is the closest East London has to a patron saint. He is also the patron saint of bell ringers and various types of metalworker. His feast day is 19 May.

Dunstan's links to the area led to his fire-tong symbol being included in the coat of arms of the Metropolitan Borough of Stepney, and the arms of its successor, the modern London Borough of Tower Hamlets.

=== Brick Lane Mosque ===
Throughout its history, the East End has evolved in response to economic and social change, including migration, with its population being joined by large numbers of people from the UK and overseas. This is exemplified by the Brick Lane Mosque.

The mosque was first built as a church by Huguenot Protestant refugees who came to East London to escape persecution in France. After much of that community moved on from the Spitalfields area it was used as a Methodist chapel for a more widely based Christian congregation. It later became a synagogue, used by Jewish people who came to avoid pogroms in the Russian Empire and other parts of Europe. The Jewish community of the area dwindled, and in 1976 the building was acquired by the local Bengali community and is now used as a mosque.

=== Weaving and mulberries ===
The importance of the textile industry to the East End is reflected in the inclusion of a sprig of Mulberry in the coat of arms of the London Borough of Tower Hamlets. Many of the borough's staff uniforms are Mulberry coloured, and the Town Hall is named Mulberry Place.

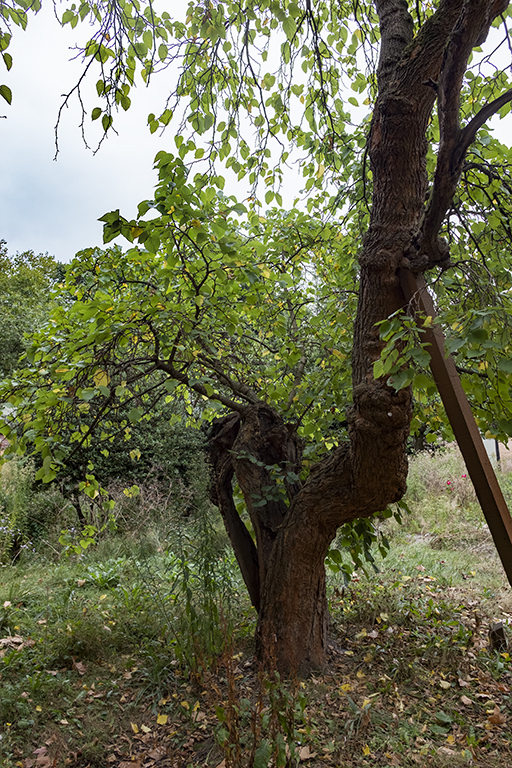
The Bethnal Green Mulberry, the East End's oldest tree.

The Bethnal Green mulberry tree, thought to be the oldest tree in the East End, was saved from developers after a long community campaign. The Council had approved a planning request which involved moving the tree, which campaigners was argued would damage or kill it. The campaigners persuaded the High Court to overturn the Council decision.

=== Military contribution ===
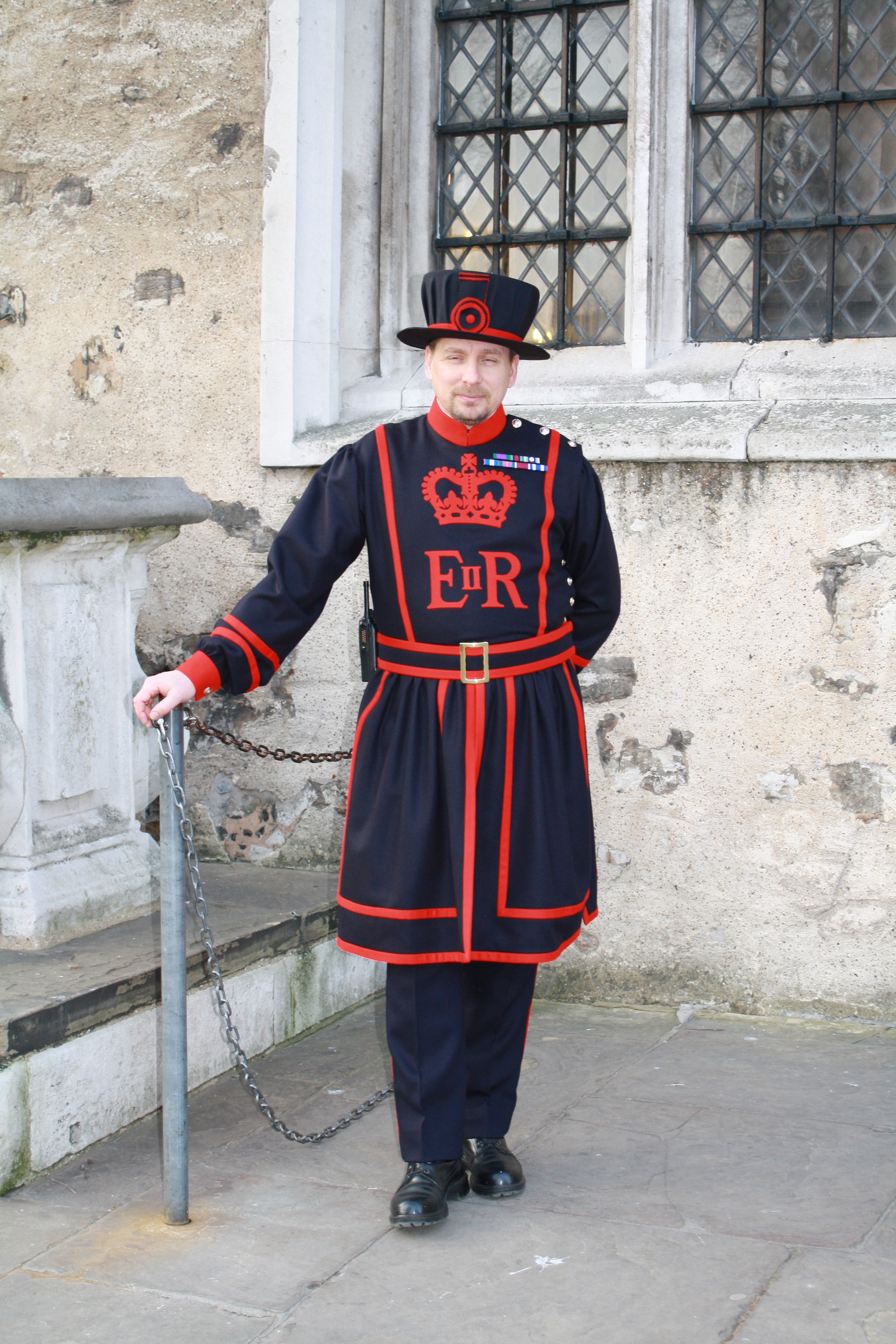
Tower Hamlets men bolstered the Tower of London garrison

The Tower Division (also known as the Tower Hamlets), was a part of Middlesex, but managed the reserve forces and other county functions itself; it was independent of the Lord Lieutenant of Middlesex, having its own Lord Lieutenant, the Constable of the Tower. The Tower Hamlets men, or Hamleteers, supplemented the Tower of London's small Yeoman Warder garrison, and were also available for use in the field. The first surviving reference to the service owed to the Tower dates to 1554, but it describes pre-existing obligations, so the association is likely to be considerably older.

Local forces continued to be primarily based on the Tower Division until its abolishment in 1900, though Tower Hamlets units remained part of the army until 1967. During the twentieth century, army units were generally based on more local areas, for instance the Poplar and Stepney Rifles. The First World War saw a proliferation of local battalions, including several "Pals" units, but this representation was reduced in the Second World War due to the smaller size of the army and the reduced emphasis on units with small recruitment areas.

=== Sport ===
There are three professional football clubs in the East End area; West Ham United, Leyton Orient and Dagenham and Redbridge. Leyton Orient and West Ham have roots in the maritime trades, with Orient having had links to the Orient Steam Navigation Company while West Ham originated as the works team of the Thames Ironworks and also had links to the Castle Shipping Line. Dagenham and Redbridge was formed by the merger of four clubs, from across East London, with a lineage dating back to 1881.

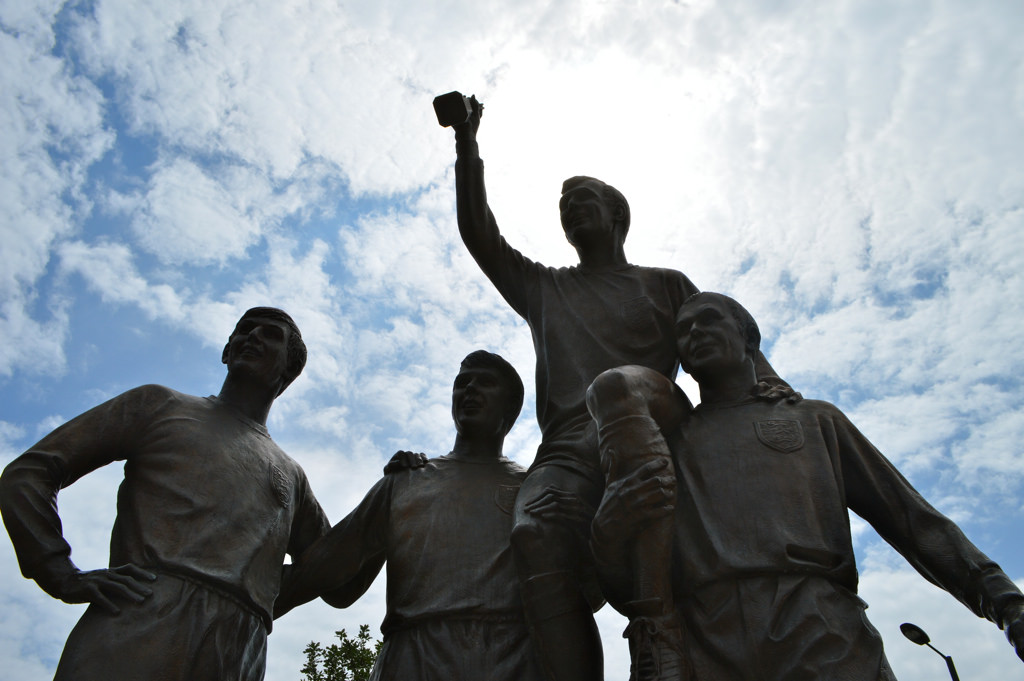
The World Cup Sculpture at Upton Park

There are not strong rivalries between the three clubs, instead there is a degree of overlap in support. By contrast, the rivalry between West Ham and Millwall is one of the fiercest in English football. Millwall, originated in the Isle of Dogs, but moved from East London to Deptford and then Bermondsey, South East London in 1910. The rivalry between West Ham and Millwall is known as the Dockers Derby, as both clubs traditionally drew much of their support from the dockyards that once lay on either side of the Thames. West Ham fans made up the majority of the crowd when nearly 300,000 people (according to police estimates) attended the 1923 FA Cup Final, probably the largest ever attendance at a football match.

In 1938, West Ham's Jewish inside-left Len Goulden (born Hackney, raised in Plaistow), scored England's winning goal against Germany in Berlin, in front of 110,000 Germans including Hermann Goerring and Josef Goebbels, in a game Hitler had hoped to use for propaganda purposes. The encounter is noteworthy because the Foreign Office had pressured the England team to give the Nazi Salute before the game in an effort to ease international tension. Goulden's goal, which team-mate Stanley Matthews described as "the greatest goal I ever saw" has been described as the East End's "Jesse Owens moment". Goulden celebrated with a shout of "Let 'em salute that".

In 1966, three West Ham players (Bobby Moore from Barking, Martin Peters from Plaistow and Geoff Hurst from Chelmsford) were major contributors as England (managed by Alf Ramsey from Dagenham) won the World Cup, beating West Germany in extra-time at Wembley. West Hams anthem I'm Forever Blowing Bubbles was used in the 2012 Olympic Opening Ceremony for the London Olympics of 2012, with director Danny Boyle remarking that he couldn't tell the story of the East End without reference to the club.

=== Pearlies ===
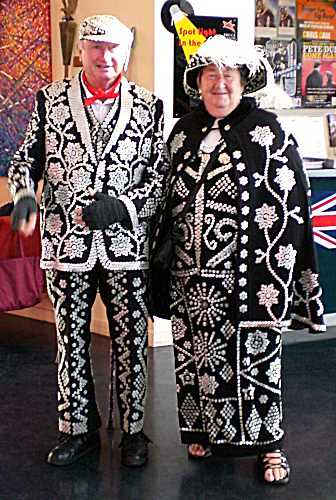
Pearly King and Queen

The Pearly Kings and Queens, or more usually pearlies, are a traditional part of London costermonger culture, their name derives from their clothes which are decorated with mother-of-pearl buttons.

The pearlies are described as the 'aristocracy' of the costermongers and were originally elected by them to safeguard their rights from competitors and 'roughs'. They are now devoted entirely to charitable activities. Pearlies are part of the East End's heritage, but contrary to the widespread perception, they are not an exclusively East End institution, there are Pearly Kings and Queens across inner London. A parade of real-life Pearly Kings and Queens was featured at the 2012 Summer Olympics Opening Ceremony.

== Politics and social reform ==
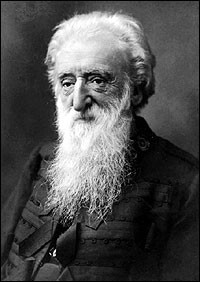
William Booth founded the Salvation Army, in Whitechapel, in 1878

At the end of the 17th century large numbers of Huguenot weavers arrived in the East End, settling to service an industry that grew up around the new estate at Spitalfields, where master weavers were based. They brought with them a tradition of "reading clubs", where books were read, often in public houses. The authorities were suspicious of immigrants meeting and in some ways they were right to be as these grew into workers' associations and political organisations. Towards the middle of the 18th century the silk industry fell into a decline – partly due to the introduction of printed calico cloth – and riots ensued. These "Spitalfield Riots" of 1769 were actually centred to the east and were put down with considerable force, culminating in two men being hanged in front of the Salmon and Ball public house at Bethnal Green. One was John Doyle (an Irish weaver), the other John Valline (of Huguenot descent).

Elizabeth Fry of East and then West Ham, was an influential social reformer, particularly noted for helping deliver the Gaols Act 1823 which significantly improved prison conditions. In 1844, an Association for Promoting Cleanliness among the Poor was established, and built a bath-house and laundry in Glasshouse Yard, East Smithfield. This cost a single penny for bathing or washing, and by June 1847 was receiving 4,284 people a year. This led to an act of Parliament, the Baths and Washhouses Act 1846 (9 & 10 Vict. c. 74), to encourage other municipalities to build their own and the model spread quickly throughout the East End. Timbs noted that "... so strong was the love of cleanliness thus encouraged that women often toiled to wash their own and their children's clothing, who had been compelled to sell their hair to purchase food to satisfy the cravings of hunger".

William Booth began his Christian Revival Society in 1865, preaching the gospel in a tent erected in the Friends Burial Ground, Thomas Street, Whitechapel. Others joined his Christian Mission, and on 7 August 1878 the Salvation Army was formed at a meeting held at 272 Whitechapel Road. A statue commemorates both his mission and his work in helping the poor. Dubliner Thomas John Barnardo came to the London Hospital, Whitechapel to train for medical missionary work in China. Soon after his arrival in 1866 a cholera epidemic swept the East End killing 3,000 people. Many families were left destitute, with thousands of children orphaned and forced to beg or find work in the factories. In 1867, Barnardo set up a Ragged School to provide a basic education but was shown the many children sleeping rough. His first home for boys was established at 18 Stepney Causeway in 1870. When a boy died after being turned away (the home was full), the policy was instituted of "No Destitute Child Ever Refused Admission".

In 1884, the Settlement movement was founded, with settlements such as Toynbee Hall and Oxford House, to encourage university students to live and work in the slums, experience the conditions and try to alleviate some of the poverty and misery in the East End. Notable residents of Toynbee Hall included R. H. Tawney, Clement Attlee, Guglielmo Marconi, and William Beveridge. The Hall continues to exert considerable influence, with the Workers Educational Association (1903), Citizens Advice Bureau (1949) and Child Poverty Action Group (1965) all being founded or influenced by it.

In 1888, the matchgirls of Bryant and May in Bow went on strike for better working conditions. Another notable strike by women was in 1968, when female staff at the Ford plant in Dagenham took industrial action to gain the same wages as male staff. This ultimately led the government to introduce the Equal Pay Act 1970. These actions, combined with the many dock strikes, made the East End a key element in the foundation and achievements of modern socialist and trade union organisations, as well as the Suffragette movement.

The Communist Manifesto was first published, in German, at a printers at 146 Liverpool Street, in Bishopsgate Without, in 1848. Towards the end of the 19th century, a new wave of radicalism came to the East End, arriving both with Jewish émigrés fleeing from Eastern European persecution, and Russian and German radicals avoiding arrest. A German émigré anarchist, Rudolf Rocker, began writing in Yiddish for Arbayter Fraynd (Workers' Friend). By 1912, he had organised a mass London garment workers' strike for better conditions and an end to "sweating". Amongst the Russians was fellow anarchist Peter Kropotkin who helped found the Freedom Press in Whitechapel. Afanasy Matushenko, one of the leaders of the Potemkin mutiny, fled the failure of the Russian Revolution of 1905 to seek sanctuary in Stepney Green. Leon Trotsky and Vladimir Lenin attended meetings of the newspaper Iskra in 1903, in Whitechapel; and in 1907 Lenin and Joseph Stalin attended the Fifth Congress of the Russian Social Democratic Labour Party held at the Brotherhood Church in De Beauvoir Town. That congress consolidated the leadership of Lenin's Bolshevik faction and debated strategy for the communist revolution in Russia. Trotsky noted, in his memoirs, meeting Maxim Gorky and Rosa Luxemburg at the conference.

By the 1880s, the casual system caused dock workers to unionise under Ben Tillett and John Burns. This led to a demand for "6d per hour" (the "Docker's Tanner"), and an end to casual labour in the docks. Colonel G. R. Birt, the general manager at Millwall Docks, gave evidence to a parliamentary committee, on the physical condition of the workers:

The poor fellows are miserably clad, scarcely with a boot on their foot, in a most miserable state.... These are men who come to work in our docks who come on without having a bit of food in their stomachs, perhaps since the previous day; they have worked for an hour and have earned 5d. [2p]; their hunger will not allow them to continue: they take the 5d. in order that they may get food, perhaps the first food they have had for twenty-four hours.

— Col. G. R. Birt, in evidence to the Parliamentary Committee (1889)

These conditions earned dockers much public sympathy, and they also obtained financial support from fellow dockworkers in Australian port cities. After a bitter struggle and the mediation of Cardinal Manning, the London Dock Strike of 1889 was settled with victory for the strikers, and established a national movement for the unionisation of casual workers, as opposed to the craft unions that already existed.

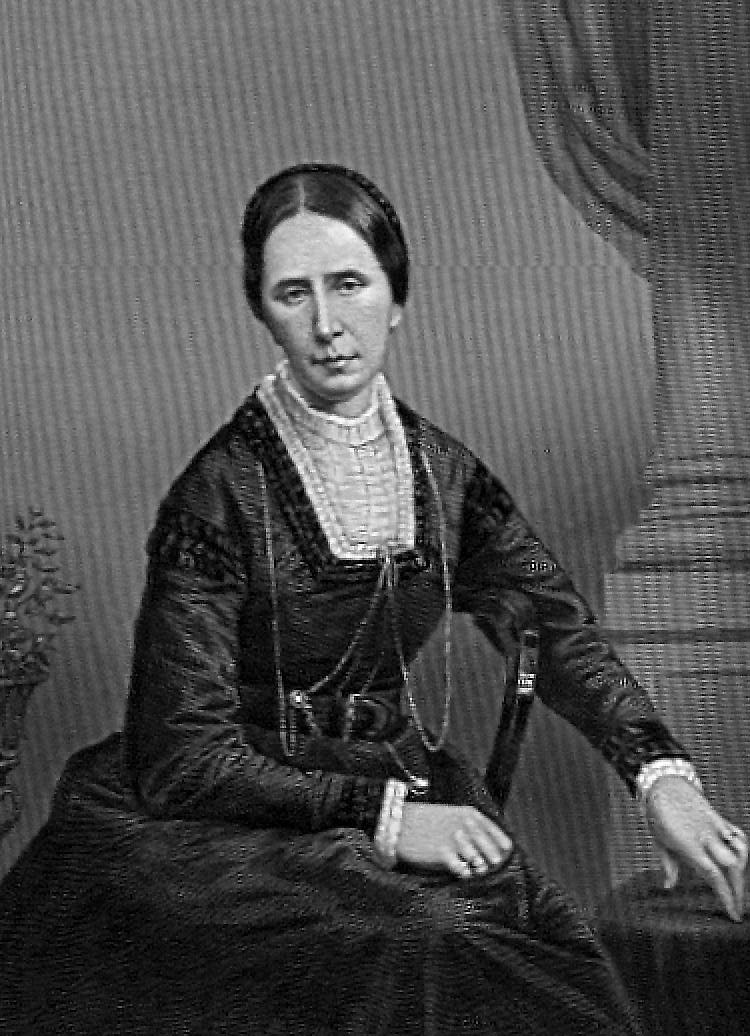
Lady Burdett-Coutts

The philanthropist Angela Burdett-Coutts was active in the East End, alleviating poverty by founding a sewing school for ex-weavers in Spitalfields and building the ornate Columbia Market in Bethnal Green. She helped to inaugurate the London Society for the Prevention of Cruelty to Children, was a keen supporter of the Ragged School Union, and operated housing schemes similar to those of the Model Dwellings Companies such as the East End Dwellings Company and the Four Per Cent Industrial Dwellings Company, where investors received a financial return on their philanthropy. Between the 1890s and 1903, when the work was published, the social campaigner Charles Booth instigated an investigation into the life of London poor (based at Toynbee Hall), much of which was centred on the poverty and conditions in the East End. Further investigations were instigated by the Royal Commission on the Poor Laws and Relief of Distress 1905–09, the Commission found it difficult to agree, beyond that change was necessary and produced separate minority and majority reports. The minority report was the work of Booth with the founders of the London School of Economics Sidney and Beatrice Webb. They advocated focusing on the causes of poverty and the radical notion of poverty being involuntary, rather than the result of innate indolence. At the time their work was rejected but was gradually adopted as policy by successive governments.

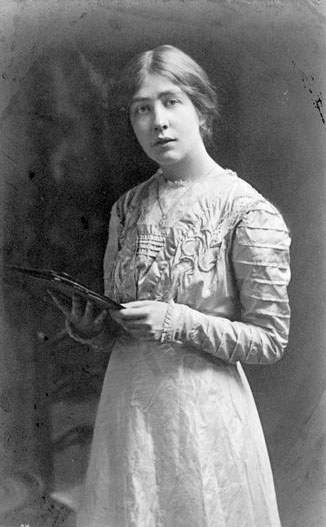
Sylvia Pankhurst (1882–1960)

Sylvia Pankhurst became increasingly disillusioned with the suffragette movement's inability to engage with the needs of working-class women, so in 1912 she formed her own breakaway movement, the East London Federation of Suffragettes. She based it at a baker's shop at Bow emblazoned with the slogan, "Votes for Women", in large gold letters. The local Member of Parliament, George Lansbury, resigned his seat in the House of Commons to stand for election on a platform of women's enfranchisement. Pankhurst supported him in this, and Bow Road became the campaign office, culminating in a huge rally in nearby Victoria Park. Lansbury was narrowly defeated in the election, however, and support for the project in the East End was withdrawn. Pankhurst refocused her efforts, and with the outbreak of the First World War, she began a nursery, clinic and cost price canteen for the poor at the bakery. A paper, the Women's Dreadnought, was published to bring her campaign to a wider audience. Pankhurst spent twelve years in Bow fighting for women's rights. During this time, she risked constant arrest and spent many months in Holloway Prison, often on hunger strike. She finally achieved her aim of full adult female suffrage when the Representation of the People (Equal Franchise) Act 1928 passed, and along the way she alleviated some of the poverty and misery, and improved social conditions for all in the East End.

The alleviation of widespread unemployment and hunger in Poplar had to be funded from money raised by the borough itself under the Poor Law. The poverty of the borough made this patently unfair and lead to the 1921 conflict between government and the local councillors known as the Poplar Rates Rebellion. Council meetings were for a time held in Brixton prison, and the councillors received wide support. Ultimately, this led to the abolition of the Poor Laws through the Local Government Act 1929.

The General Strike had begun as a dispute between miners and their employers outside London in 1925. On 1 May 1926 the Trades Union Congress called out workers all over the country, including the London dockers. The government had had over a year to prepare and deployed troops to break the dockers' picket lines. Armed food convoys, accompanied by armoured cars, drove down the East India Dock Road. By 10 May, a meeting was brokered at Toynbee Hall to end the strike. The TUC were forced into a humiliating climbdown and the general strike ended on 11 May, with the miners holding out until November.

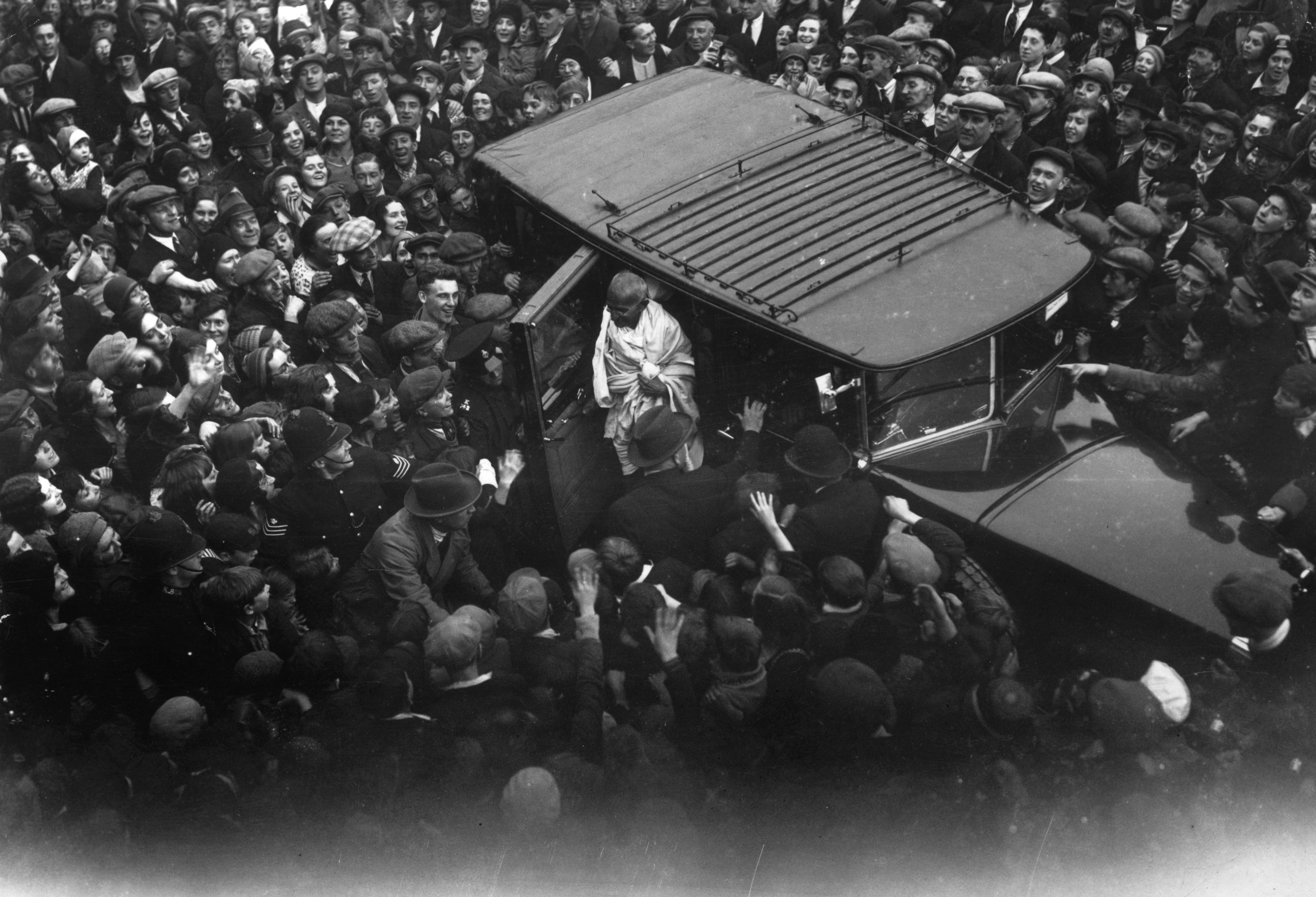
Canning Town greets Gandhi. Gandhi lived among ordinary East Enders for three months in 1931.

In 1915, the Christian Socialists, Doris and Muriel Lester, founded the first Kingsley Hall, in Bromley-by-Bow. The centres were initially established as places people could meet for social, educational and recreational interaction, without any barriers of class, colour or creed. This later extended to include social welfare. Mahatma Gandhi stayed at the centre for three months in 1931, during talks held with the British government. He became a popular and familiar sight in the surrounding districts during that time. He preferred to stay with the poor people of East London, rather than take up the government's offer of an expensive West End hotel.

== Wars and conflict ==
As well as actions involving the Tower of London and its garrison, the area has seen several episodes of armed conflict.

=== Roman era massacre ===
Blomfield Street on the western edge of the Bishopsgate Without area covers part of the course of the Walbrook River. This section of the Walbrook is the main focus of the Walbrook Skulls phenomena, whereby very great quantities of Roman era skulls have been found on the riverbed. Most of the theories explaining the presence of these heads point to a massacre of prisoners in the immediate aftermath of a Roman era conflict.

=== Wars of the Roses ===
In 1471 the Yorkist Edward IV had won the Battle of Barnet capturing his rival, the Lancastrian Henry VI and imprisoning him in the Tower of London. He then headed to western England to campaign there.

The Yorkist Bastard Fauconberg took the opportunity afforded by Edward's absence and raised armies in Kent and Essex, which besieged and attempted to storm London, in an attempt to free Henry from the Tower.

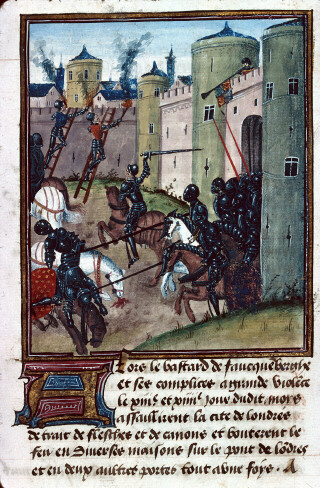
Yorkist defenders sally from Aldgate (possibly Bishopsgate)

Fauconberg unsuccessfully tried to battle across London Bridge and also attacked the eastern gates with five thousand men and artillery. Breweries and alehouses in the eastern suburb of St Katharines, outside the wall, were ransacked and set on fire by the attackers at this time.

Bishopsgate was set on fire and the attackers came close to capturing Aldgate and with it the City. The gate was breached and the attackers started to pour through, but a portcullis was dropped when only some had passed through, killing some and isolating those who had already passed through – these were then killed by the defenders.

A force of troops from the Tower garrison came through the Tower Hill Postern, the small side gate where the City wall met the Tower moat and attacked the pro-Lancastrian besiegers from the flank while a counter-attack was launched from within the gate. The attackers were defeated and pursued, with the Essex men retreating over Bow Bridge and the Kentish men headed to their ships at Blackwall. Both retreating groups suffered heavy casualties in the pursuit.

=== Battle of Bow Bridge ===
In June 1648, during the Second English Civil War, a force of Kentish Royalists crossed from Greenwich to Poplar, hoping to make for Essex to join up with Royalists there. The Royalists were confronted by the Tower Hamlets Militia and other Parliamentarian forces; a series of inconclusive clashes at and around Bow Bridge followed.

After the battle the Royalists made their way to Colchester which was held by Royalists at that time, entering the city just before it was besieged by Parliamentary forces. The ten week Siege of Colchester followed, ending in a victory for Parliament.

=== First World War ===
The first bomb of the first air raid fell on West Hackney on 31 May 1915, it was the first time the capital had been assaulted by a foreign enemy since William the Conqueror ravaged Southwark in 1066. The first raid killed seven in a wide arc across London, outraging public opinion. East London was at particular risk during the early attacks due to the Kaiser's order, later rescinded, that the raiders limit themselves to targets east of the Tower of London.

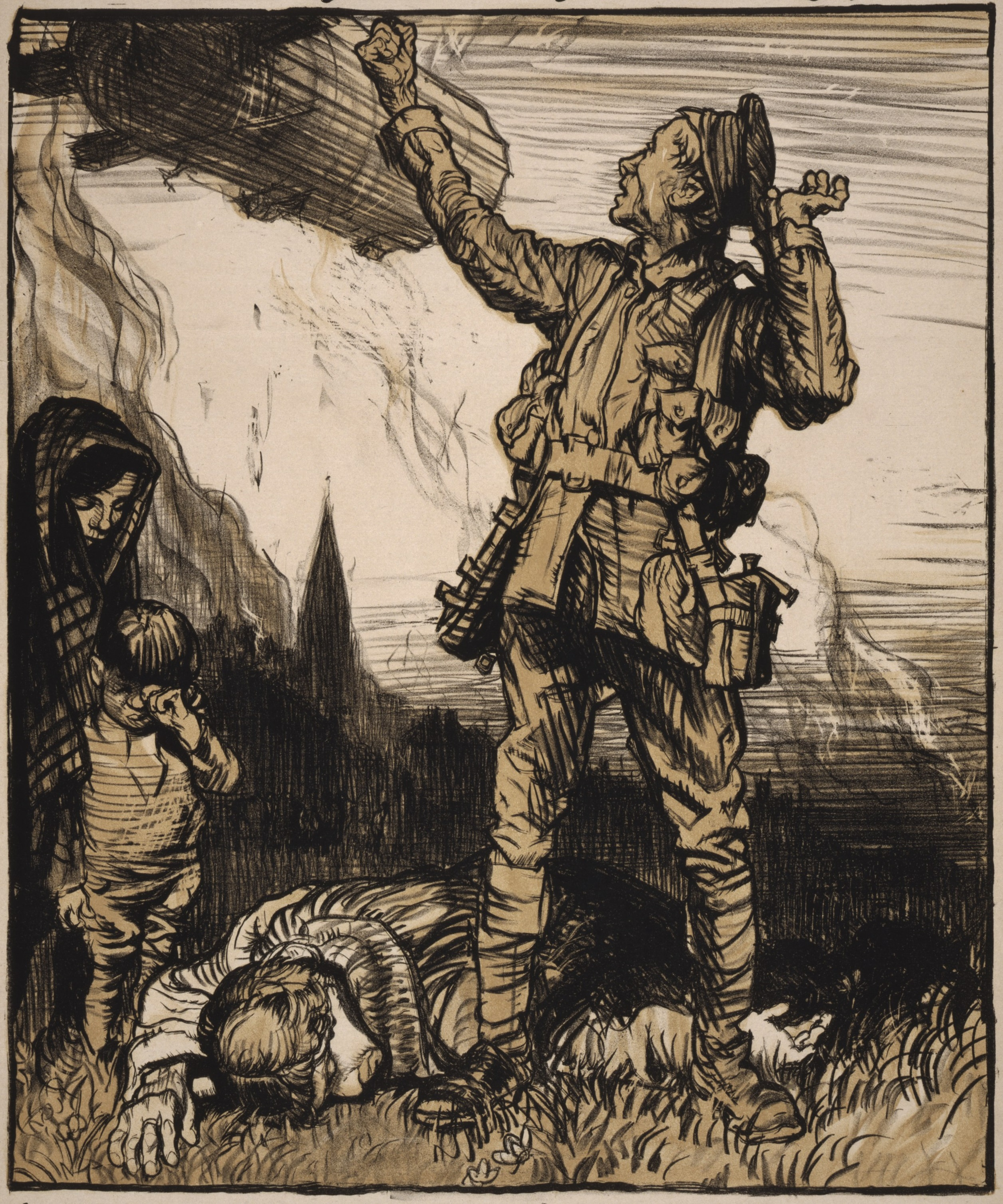
Deaths among women, children and the elderly shocked the public.

Raids by airships of the German Army and Navy continued through till 1917; with raids by fixed wing aircraft in 1917–18. The first raid by fixed wing bombers, German Gotha aircraft, on 13 June 1917 was also the first attack to take place in daylight. The attack killed 104 people, 18 of them at Upper North Street School, Poplar. During the war a total of 120 children and 104 adults were killed in the East End by aerial bombing, with many more injured.

The largest single loss of life occurred due to an industrial accident a plant producing supplies for the war effort. On 19 January 1917, 73 people died, including 14 workers, and more than 400 were injured, in a TNT explosion in the Brunner-Mond munitions factory in Silvertown. Much of the area was flattened, and the shock wave was felt throughout the City and much of Essex. This was the largest explosion in London history, and was heard in Southampton and Norwich. The explosion happened in the early evening, if it had occurred in the day, or at night then the death toll would have been much greater. Andreas Angel, chief chemist at the plant, was posthumously awarded the Edward Medal for trying to extinguish the fire that caused the blast.

=== Second World War ===
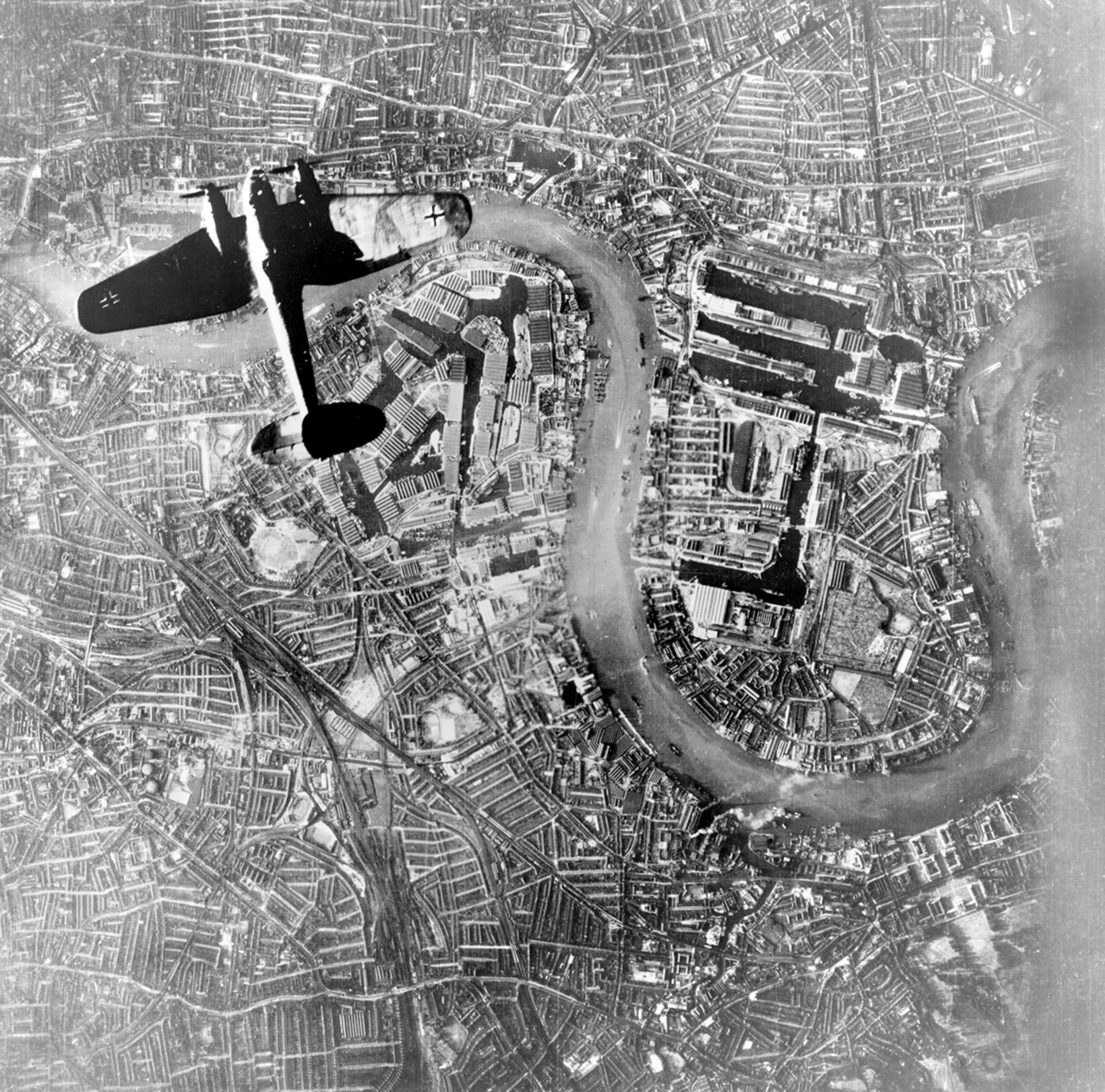
Heinkel He 111 bomber over the Surrey Commercial Docks in South London and Wapping and the Isle of Dogs on 7 September 1940

Hardest of all, the Luftwaffe will smash Stepney. I know the East End! Those dirty Jews and Cockneys will run like rabbits into their holes.

— "Lord Haw-Haw", collaborator and broadcaster

Initially, the German commanders were reluctant to bomb London, fearing retaliation against Berlin. On 24 August 1940, a single aircraft, tasked to bomb Tilbury, accidentally bombed Stepney, Bethnal Green and the City. The following night the RAF retaliated by mounting a forty aircraft raid on Berlin, with a second attack three days later. The Luftwaffe changed its strategy from attacking shipping and airfields to attacking cities. The City and West End were designated "Target Area B"; the East End and docks were "Target Area A". The first raid occurred at 4:30 p.m. on 7 September and consisted of 150 Dornier and Heinkel bombers and large numbers of fighters. This was followed by a second wave of 170 bombers. Silvertown and Canning Town bore the brunt of this first attack.

Between 7 September 1940 and 10 May 1941, a sustained bombing campaign was mounted. It began with the bombing of London for 57 successive nights, an era known as "the Blitz". East London was targeted because the area was a centre for imports and storage of raw materials for the war effort, and the German military command felt that support for the war could be damaged among the mainly working class inhabitants. On the first night of the Blitz, 430 civilians were killed and 1,600 seriously wounded. The populace responded by evacuating children and the vulnerable to the country and digging in, constructing Anderson shelters in their gardens and Morrison shelters in their houses, or going to communal shelters built in local public spaces. On 10 September 1940, 73 civilians, including women and children preparing for evacuation, were killed when a bomb hit the South Hallsville School. Although the official death toll is 73, many local people believed it must have been higher. Some estimates say 400 or even 600 may have died during this raid on Canning Town.

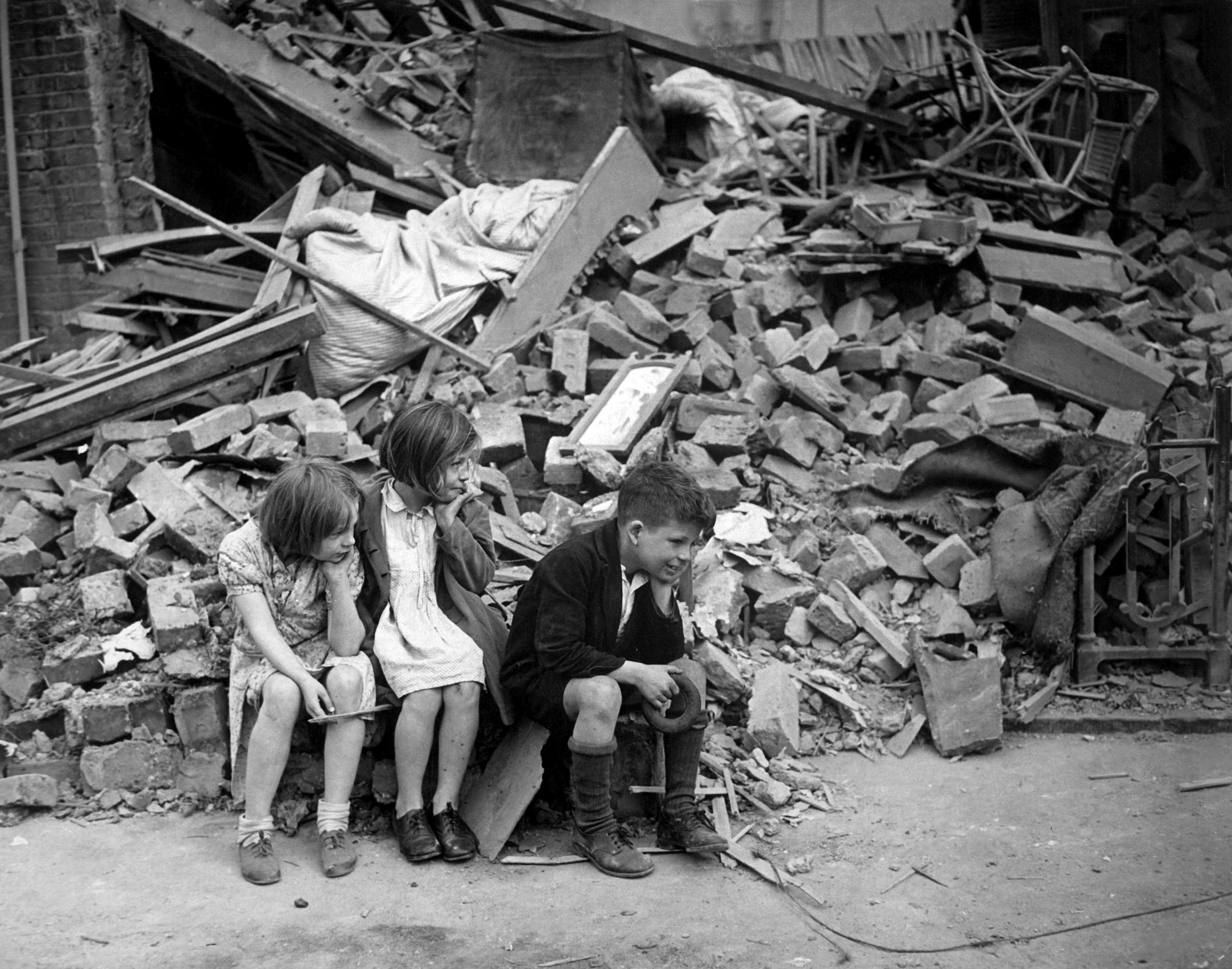
Children of an eastern suburb of London, made homeless by the Blitz

The effect of the intensive bombing worried the authorities and Mass-Observation was deployed to gauge attitudes and provide policy suggestions, as before the war they had investigated local attitudes to anti-Semitism. The organisation noted that close family and friendship links within the East End were providing the population with a surprising resilience under fire. Propaganda was issued, reinforcing the image of the "brave chirpy Cockney". On the Sunday after the Blitz began, Winston Churchill himself toured the bombed areas of Stepney and Poplar. Anti-aircraft installations were built in public parks, such as Victoria Park and the Mudchute on the Isle of Dogs, and along the line of the Thames, as this was used by the aircraft to guide them to their target.

The authorities were initially wary of opening the London Underground for shelter, fearing the effect on morale elsewhere in London and hampering normal operations. On 12 September, having suffered five days of heavy bombing, the people of the East End took the matter into their own hands and invaded Liverpool Street Station with pillows and blankets. The government relented and opened the partially completed Central line as a shelter. Many deep tube stations remained in use as shelters until the end of the war. Aerial mines were deployed on 19 September 1940. These exploded at roof top height, causing severe damage to buildings over a wider radius than the impact bombs. By now, the Port of London had sustained heavy damage with a third of its warehouses destroyed, and the West India Docks and the St Katharine Docks had been badly hit and put out of action. Bizarre events occurred when the River Lea burned with a blue flame, caused by a hit on a gin factory at Three Mills, and the Thames itself burnt fiercely when Tate & Lyle's Silvertown sugar refinery was hit.

On 3 March 1943 at 8:27 p.m., the unopened Bethnal Green Underground station was the site of a wartime disaster. Families had crowded into the underground station due to an air-raid siren at 8:17, one of 10 that day. There was a panic at 8:27 coinciding with the sound of an anti-aircraft battery (possibly the recently installed Z battery) being fired at nearby Victoria Park. In the wet, dark conditions, a woman slipped on the entrance stairs and 173 people died in the resulting crush. The truth was suppressed, and a report appeared that there had been a direct hit by a German bomb. The results of the official investigation were not released until 1946. There is now a plaque at the entrance to the tube station, which commemorates the event as the "worst civilian disaster of World War II", and a larger memorial nearby. The first V-1 flying bomb struck in Grove Road, Mile End, on 13 June 1944, killing six, injuring 30, and making 200 people homeless. The area remained derelict for many years until it was cleared to extend Mile End Park. Before demolition, local artist Rachel Whiteread made a cast of the inside of 193 Grove Road. Despite attracting controversy, the exhibit won her the Turner Prize for 1993.

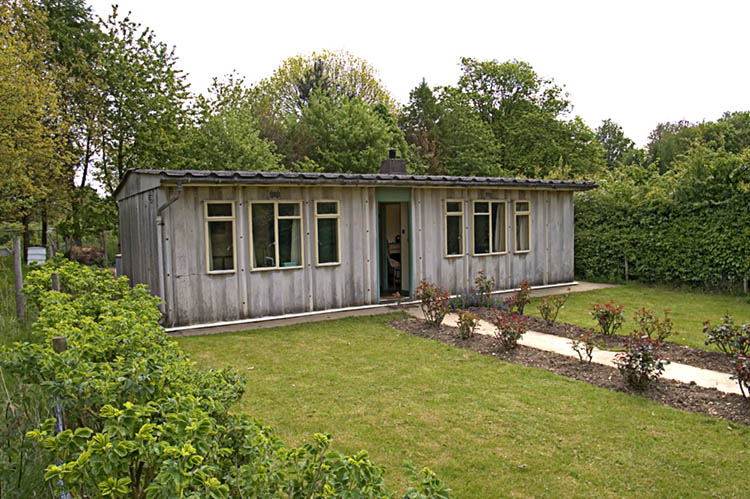
Prefabricated post-war home at Chiltern Open Air Museum: Universal House, steel frame clad with corrugated asbestos cement

It is estimated that by the end of the war, 80 tons of bombs had fallen on the Metropolitan Borough of Bethnal Green alone, affecting 21,700 houses, destroying 2,233 and making a further 893 uninhabitable. In Bethnal Green, 555 people were killed, and 400 were seriously injured. For the whole of Tower Hamlets, a total of 2,221 civilians were killed, and 7,472 were injured, with 46,482 houses destroyed and 47,574 damaged. So badly battered was the East End that when Buckingham Palace was hit during the height of the bombing, Queen Elizabeth (the future Queen Mother) observed that "It makes me feel I can look the East End in the face." By the end of the war, the East End was a scene of devastation, with large areas derelict and depopulated. War production was changed quickly to making prefabricated houses, and many were installed in the bombed areas and remained common into the 1970s. Today, 1950s and 1960s architecture dominates the housing estates of the area such as the Lansbury Estate in Poplar, much of which was built as a show-piece of the 1951 Festival of Britain.

== Peacetime disasters ==
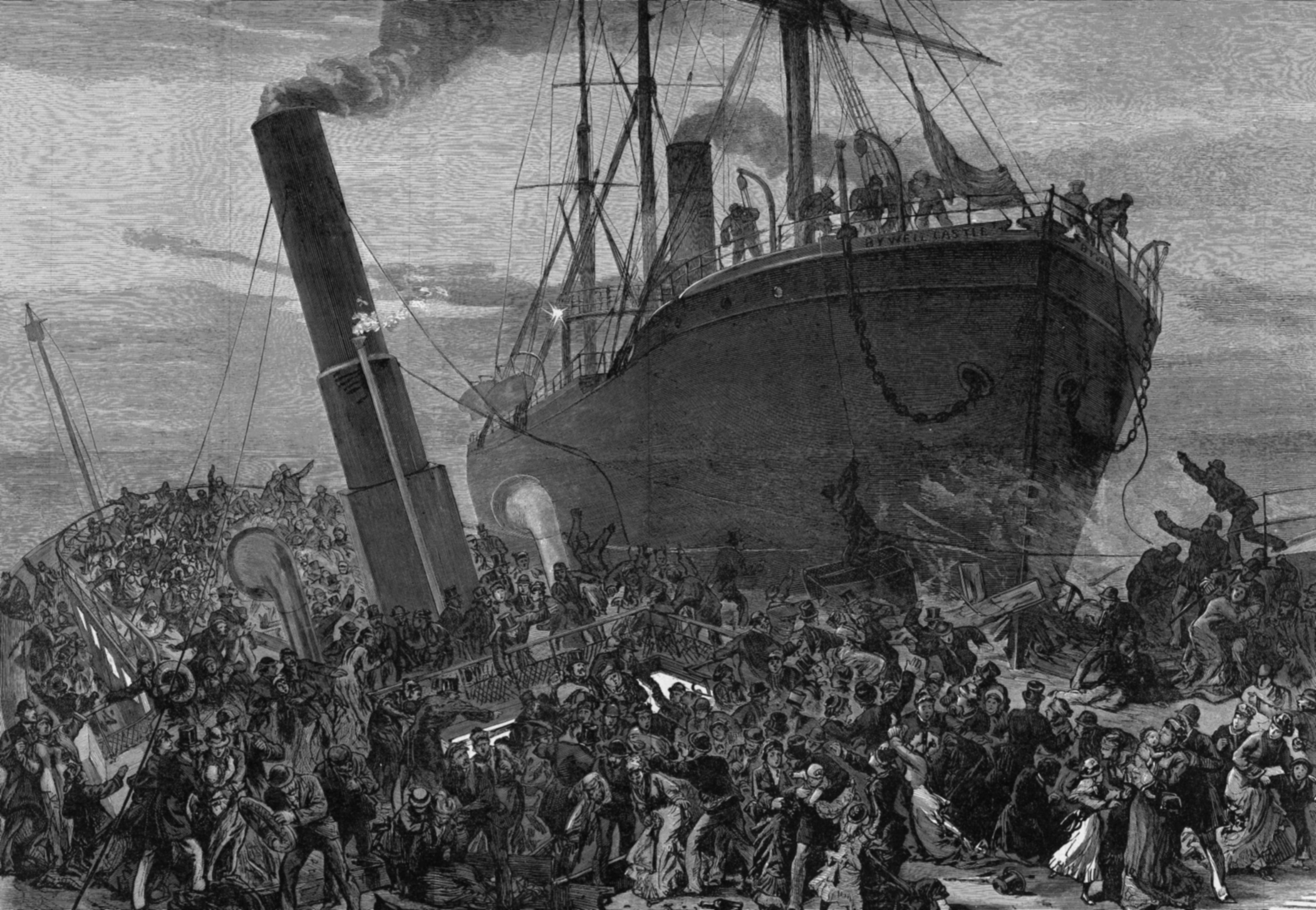
The Bywell Castle bears down upon the Princess Alice, 1878

As a maritime port, plague and pestilence has fallen on East Enders disproportionately. The area most afflicted by the Great Plague (1665) was Spitalfields, and cholera epidemics broke out in Limehouse in 1832 and struck again in 1848 and 1854. Typhus and tuberculosis were common in the crowded 19th century tenements.

The Princess Alice was a passenger steamer crowded with day trippers returning from Gravesend to Woolwich and London Bridge. On the evening of 3 September 1878, she collided with the steam collier Bywell Castle and sank into the Thames in under four minutes. Of the approximately 700 passengers, over 600 were lost.

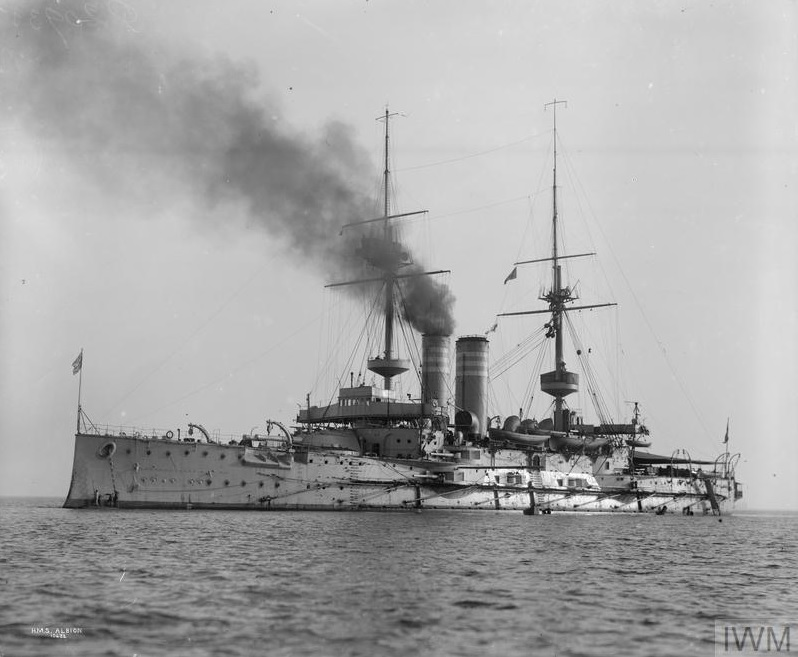
The launch of HMS Albion at Thames Ironworks in 1898 caused a displacement wave that killed 38 people.

In 1898, a great loss of life occurred when HMS Albion was launched at the Thames Ironworks shipyard at Bow Creek. The ship's entry into the water created a huge displacement wave which caused a crowded pier to collapse into the water. Large crowds had been watching the launch, a moment of celebration for the community, and 38 people, mostly women and children were drowned.

Another tragedy occurred on the morning of 16 May 1968 when Ronan Point, a 23-storey tower block in Newham, suffered a structural collapse due to a gas explosion. Four people were killed in the disaster and seventeen were injured, as an entire corner of the building slid away. The collapse caused major changes in UK building regulations and led to the decline of further building of high rise council flats that had characterised 1960s public architecture.

== Crime ==
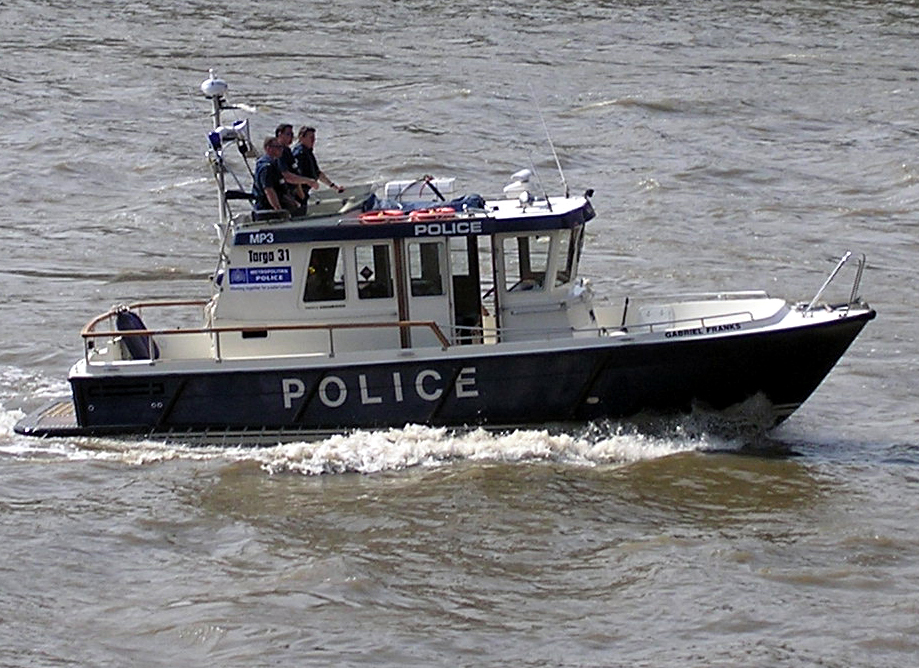
The Gabriel Franks of the Marine Support Unit of the Metropolitan Police, named after the first marine police officer killed in the line of duty

The high levels of poverty in the East End have, throughout history, corresponded with a high incidence of crime. From earliest times, crime depended, as did labour, on the importing of goods to London, and their interception in transit. Theft occurred in the river, on the quayside and in transit to the City warehouses. This was why, in the 17th century, the East India Company built high-walled docks at Blackwall and had them guarded to minimise the vulnerability of their cargoes. Armed convoys would then take the goods to the company's secure compound in the City. The practice led to the creation of ever-larger docks throughout the area, and large roads to drive through the crowded 19th century slums to carry goods from the docks.

No police force operated in London before the 1750s. Crime and disorder were dealt with by a system of magistrates and volunteer parish constables, with strictly limited jurisdiction. Salaried constables were introduced by 1792, although they were few in number and their power and jurisdiction continued to derive from local magistrates, who in extremis could be backed by militias. In 1798, England's first Marine Police Force was formed by magistrate Patrick Colquhoun and a Master Mariner, John Harriott, to tackle theft and looting from ships anchored in the Pool of London and the lower reaches of the river. Its base was (and remains) in Wapping High Street. It is now known as the Marine Support Unit.

In 1829, the Metropolitan Police Force was formed, with a remit to patrol within 7 mi (11 km) of Charing Cross, with a force of 1,000 men in 17 divisions, including 'H' division, based in Stepney. Each division was controlled by a superintendent, under whom were four inspectors and sixteen sergeants. The regulations demanded that recruits should be under thirty-five years of age, well built, at least 5 ft 7 in (1.70 m) in height, literate and of good character.

Unlike the former constables, the police were recruited widely and financed by a levy on ratepayers; so they were initially disliked. The force took until the mid-19th century to be established in the East End. Unusually, Joseph Sadler Thomas, a Metropolitan Police superintendent of "F" (Covent Garden) Division, appears to have mounted the first local investigation (in Bethnal Green), in November 1830 of the London Burkers. A specific Dockyard division of the Metropolitan force was formed to assume responsibility for shore patrols within the docks in 1841, a detective department was formed in 1842, and in 1865, "J" division was established in Bethnal Green.

One of the East End industries that serviced ships moored off the Pool of London was prostitution, and in the 17th century, this was centred on the Ratcliffe Highway, a long street lying on the high ground above the riverside settlements. In 1600, it was described by the antiquarian John Stow as "a continual street, or filthy straight passage, with alleys of small tenements or cottages builded, inhabited by sailors and victuallers". Crews were paid off at the end of a long voyage, and would spend their earnings on drink in the local taverns.

One madame described as "the great bawd of the seamen" by Samuel Pepys was Damaris Page. Born in Stepney in approximately 1610, she had moved from prostitution to running brothels, including one on the Highway that catered for ordinary seaman and a further establishment nearby that catered for the more expensive tastes amongst the officers and gentry. She died wealthy, in 1669, in a house on the Highway, despite charges being brought against her and time spent in Newgate Prison.

By the 19th century, an attitude of toleration had changed, and the social reformer William Acton described the riverside prostitutes as a "horde of human tigresses who swarm the pestilent dens by the riverside at Ratcliffe and Shadwell". The Society for the Suppression of Vice estimated that between the Houndsditch, Whitechapel and Ratcliffe areas there were 1803 prostitutes; and between Mile End, Shadwell and Blackwall 963 women in the trade. They were often victims of circumstance, there being no welfare state and a high mortality rate amongst the inhabitants that left wives and daughters destitute, with no other means of income.

At the same time, religious reformers began to introduce "seamens' missions" throughout the dock areas that sought both to provide for seafarers' physical needs and to keep them away from the temptations of drink and women. Eventually, the passage of the Contagious Diseases Prevention Act in 1864 allowed policemen to arrest prostitutes and detain them in hospital. The act was repealed in 1886, after agitation by early feminists, such as Josephine Butler and Elizabeth Wolstenholme, led to the formation of the Ladies National Association for the Repeal of the Contagious Diseases Acts.

Notable crimes in the area include the Ratcliff Highway murders (1811); the killings committed by the London Burkers (apparently inspired by Burke and Hare) in Bethnal Green (1831); the notorious serial killings of prostitutes by Jack the Ripper (1888); and the Siege of Sidney Street (1911) (in which anarchists, inspired by the legendary Peter the Painter, took on Home Secretary Winston Churchill, and the army).

In the 1960s the East End was the area most associated with gangster activity, most notably that of the Kray twins. The 1996 Docklands bombing caused significant damage around South Quay Station, to the south of the main Canary Wharf development. Two people were killed and thirty-nine injured in one of Mainland Britain's biggest bomb attacks by the Provisional Irish Republican Army. This led to the introduction of police checkpoints controlling access to the Isle of Dogs, reminiscent of the City's "ring of steel".

== Entertainment ==
Inn-yard theatres were first established in the Tudor period, with the Boar's Head Inn (1557) in Whitechapel, the George in Stepney and John Brayne's short lived but purpose-built Red Lion Theatre (1567), nearby.

In 1574 the City authorities banned the building of playhouses in the City of London, so new theatres were built in the suburbs, beyond its jurisdiction. The East End, notably Shoreditch, become a major centre of the Elizabethan Theatre, with existing venues joined by additions. The first permanent theatres with resident companies were constructed in Shoreditch, with James Burbage's The Theatre (1576) and Henry Lanman's Curtain Theatre (1577) in close proximity.

These venues played a major part in Shakespeare's early career, with Romeo and Juliet and Henry V first performed at the Curtain. The play Henry V makes direct reference to the Curtain Theatre

Can this Cock-Pit hold within this Woodden O, the very Caskes that did affright the Ayre at Agincourt?

— Henry V, by William Shakespeare

On the night of 28 December 1598 Burbage's sons dismantled The Theatre, and moved it piece by piece across the Thames to construct the Globe Theatre.

The Goodman's Fields Theatre was established in 1727, and was where David Garrick made his début as Richard III, in 1741. In the 19th century the East End's theatres rivalled those of the West End in their grandeur and seating capacity . The first of this era was the ill-fated Brunswick Theatre (1828), which collapsed three days after opening, killing 15 people. This was followed by the Pavilion Theatre, Whitechapel (1828), the Garrick (1831) in Leman Street, the Effingham (1834) in Whitechapel, the Standard (1835) in Shoreditch, the City of London (1837) in Norton Folgate, then the Grecian and the Britannia Theatre in Hoxton (1840). Though very popular for a time, these theatres closed from the 1860s onwards, with the buildings subsequently demolished

There were also many Yiddish theatres, particularly around Whitechapel. These developed into professional companies, after the arrival of Jacob Adler in 1884 and the formation of his Russian Jewish Operatic Company that first performed in Beaumont Hall, Stepney, and then found homes both in the Prescott Street Club, Stepney, and in Princelet Street in Spitalfields. The Pavilion became an exclusively Yiddish theatre in 1906, finally closing in 1936 and being demolished in 1960. Other important Jewish theatres were Feinmans, The Jewish National Theatre and the Grand Palais. Performances were in Yiddish, and predominantly melodrama. These declined, as audience and actors left for New York and the more prosperous parts of London.

The once popular music halls of the East End have mostly met the same fate as the theatres. Prominent examples included the London Music Hall (1856–1935), 95–99 Shoreditch High Street, and the Royal Cambridge Music Hall (1864–1936), 136 Commercial Street. An example of a "giant pub hall", Wilton's Music Hall (1858), remains in Grace's Alley, off Cable Street and the early "saloon style" Hoxton Hall (1863) survives in Hoxton Street, Hoxton. The Albert Saloon was a theatre based at Britannia Fields. Many popular music hall stars came from the East End, including Marie Lloyd.

The music hall tradition of live entertainment lingers on in East End public houses, with music and singing. This is complemented by less respectable amusements such as striptease, which, since the 1950s has become a fixture of certain East End pubs, particularly in the area of Shoreditch, despite being a target of local authority restraints.

Novelist and social commentator Walter Besant proposed a "Palace of Delight" with concert halls, reading rooms, picture galleries, an art school and various classes, social rooms and frequent fêtes and dances. This coincided with a project by the philanthropist businessman, Edmund Hay Currie to use the money from the winding up of the Beaumont Trust, together with subscriptions to build a "People's Palace" in the East End. Five acres of land were secured on the Mile End Road, and the Queen's Hall was opened by Queen Victoria on 14 May 1887. The complex was completed with a library, swimming pool, gymnasium and winter garden, by 1892, providing an eclectic mix of populist entertainment and education. A peak of 8000 tickets were sold for classes in 1892, and by 1900, a Bachelor of Science degree awarded by the University of London was introduced. In 1931, the building was destroyed by fire, but the Draper's Company, major donors to the original scheme, invested more to rebuild the technical college and create Queen Mary's College in December 1934. A new 'People's Palace' was constructed, in 1937, by the Metropolitan Borough of Stepney, in St Helen's Terrace. This finally closed in 1954.

Professional theatre returned briefly to the East End in 1972, with the formation of the Half Moon Theatre in a rented former synagogue in Aldgate. In 1979, they moved to a former Methodist chapel, near Stepney Green and built a new theatre on the site, which opened in 1985, and gave premières to Dario Fo, Edward Bond and Steven Berkoff. The theatre spawned two further arts projects: the Half Moon Photography Workshop, and the Half Moon Young People's Theatre, which remains active in Tower Hamlets.

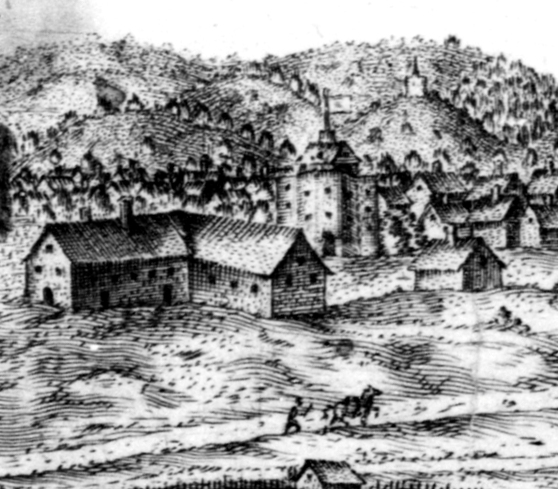
Curtain Theatre, c. 1600 (some sources identify this as a depiction of The Theatre, the other Elizabethan theatre in Shoreditch)

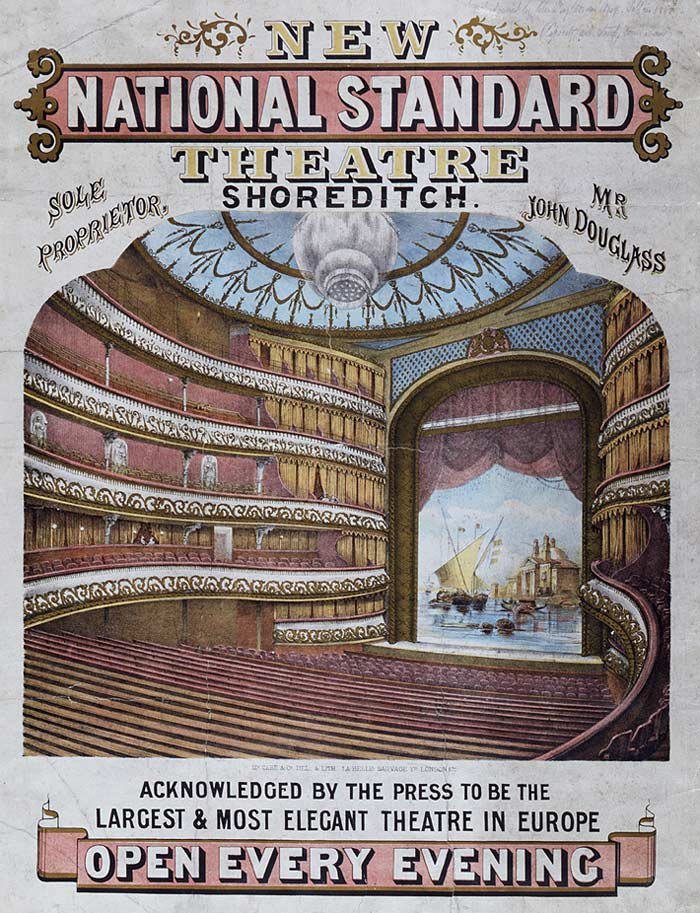
1867 Poster from the National Standard Theatre, Shoreditch

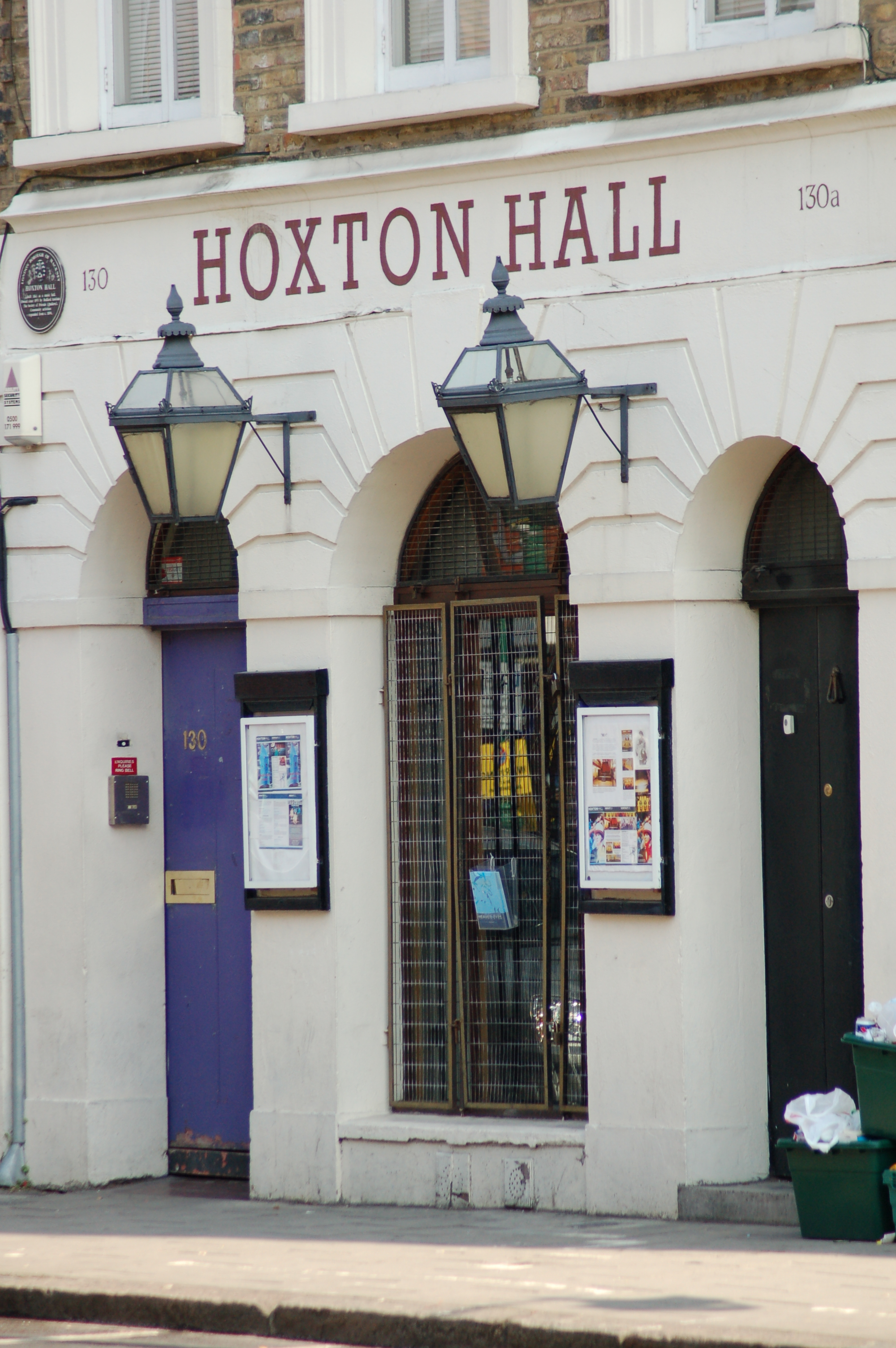
Hoxton Hall, still an active community resource and performance space

== Outside perception ==
=== Reputation ===
Society at large viewed the East End with a mixture of suspicion and fascination, with the use of the term East End in a pejorative sense beginning in the late 19th century, as the expansion of London's population led to extreme overcrowding throughout the area and a concentration of poor people and immigrants. The problems were exacerbated with the construction of St Katharine Docks (1827) and the central London railway termini (1840–1875) that caused the clearance of former slums and rookeries, with many of the displaced people moving into the East End. Over the course of a century, the East End became synonymous with poverty, overcrowding, disease and criminality.

[The] invention about 1880 of the term "East End" was rapidly taken up by the new halfpenny press, and in the pulpit and the music hall ... A shabby man from Paddington, St Marylebone or Battersea might pass muster as one of the respectable poor. But the same man coming from Bethnal Green, Shadwell or Wapping was an "East Ender", the box of Keating's bug powder must be reached for, and the spoons locked up. In the long run this cruel stigma came to do good. It was a final incentive to the poorest to get out of the "East End" at all costs, and it became a concentrated reminder to the public conscience that nothing to be found in the "East End" should be tolerated in a Christian country.

— The Nineteenth Century XXIV (1888)

This idea of the East End as lying beyond the pale of respectability was also emphasised by Jack London when he visited London in 1902, and found that his Hackney carriage driver claimed not to know it. London observed: "Thomas Cook and Son, path-finders and trail-clearers, living sign-posts to all the World.... knew not the way to the East End".

=== Popular culture ===
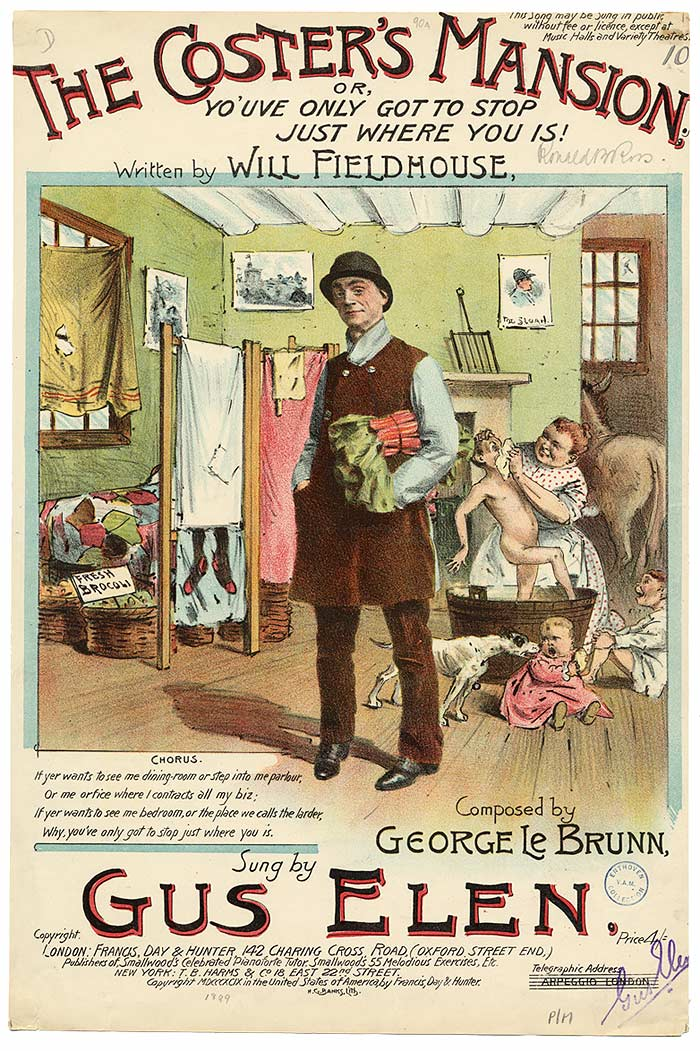
Gus Elen, The Coster's Mansion, 1899 sheet music

The East End has been the subject of parliamentary commissions and other examinations of social conditions since the 19th century, as seen in Henry Mayhew's London Labour and the London Poor (1851) and Charles Booth's Life and Labour of the People in London (third, expanded edition 1902–3, in 17 volumes). Arthur Morrison's novel A Child of the Jago (1896) is set in Bethnal Green, and recounts the story of a boy growing up in a slum surrounding Arnold Circus. Narrative accounts of experiences amongst the East End poor were also written by Jack London in The People of the Abyss (1903), by George Orwell in parts of his novel Down and Out in Paris and London, recounting his own experiences in the 1930s, as well as the Jewish writer Emanuel Litvinoff in his autobiographical novel Journey Through a Small Planet set in the 1930s. A further detailed study of Bethnal Green was carried out in the 1950s by sociologists Michael Young and Peter Willmott, in Family and Kinship in East London.

Themes from these social investigations have been drawn out in fiction. Crime, poverty, vice, sexual transgression, drugs, class-conflict and multi-cultural encounters and fantasies involving Jewish, Chinese and Indian immigrants are major themes. Though the area has been productive of local writing talent, from the time of Oscar Wilde's The Picture of Dorian Gray (1891) the idea of 'slumming it' in the 'forbidden' East End has held a fascination for a coterie of the literati.

The image of the East Ender changed dramatically between the 19th century and the 20th. From the 1870s they were characterised in culture as often shiftless, untrustworthy and responsible for their own poverty. However, many East Enders worked in lowly but respectable occupations such as carters, porters and costermongers. This latter group particularly became the subject of music hall songs at the turn of the 20th century, with performers such as Marie Lloyd, Gus Elen and Albert Chevalier establishing the image of the humorous East End Cockney and highlighting the conditions of ordinary workers. This image, buoyed by close family and social links and the community's fortitude in the war, came to be represented in literature and film. However, with the rise of the Kray twins in the 1960s the dark side of East End character returned with a new emphasis on criminality and gangsterism.

The success of Jennifer Worth's memoir Call the Midwife (2002, reissued 2007), which became a major best-seller and was adapted by the BBC into their most popular new programme since the current ratings system began, has led to a high level of interest in true-life stories from the East End. Melanie McGrath's Silvertown (2003), about her grandmother's life in the East End, was also a best-seller, as was the follow-up Hopping, about the annual East Enders' 'holiday' hop-picking in Kent. A raft of similar books was published in the 2000s, among them Gilda O'Neill's best-selling Our Street (2004), Piers Dudgeon's Our East End (2009), Jackie Hyam's Bombsites and Lollipops (2011) and Grace Foakes' Four Meals for Fourpence (reprinted 2011). In 2012, HarperCollins published The Sugar Girls, a book which tells the true stories of women working at Tate & Lyle's factories in Silvertown since 1944. The authors commented that many of the East Enders they interviewed were unhappy with the way their neighbourhoods had previously been portrayed in books and on screen – as squalid and criminal, in the Dickensian vein, and as a result they were keen to emphasise the positive aspects of East End life and community. 2012 also saw the publication of Spitalfields Life, a book adapted from the very successful blog of the same name, in which 'the gentle author' (who is anonymous) writes about, and celebrates, the lives of the men and women who live and work in the East End community of Spitalfields.

The popular, long-running British soap opera EastEnders is set in the East End.

== See also ==
- Arrival of black immigrants in London
- Historical immigration to Great Britain
- History of Bangladeshis in the United Kingdom
- London Docklands
- West End of London

=== Museums of local history ===
- Island History Trust
- Ragged School Museum
- V&A Museum of Childhood
