= Liberties of the Tower of London =

Liberty in Central London

Liberties of the Tower of London Tower Liberty
- Liberty
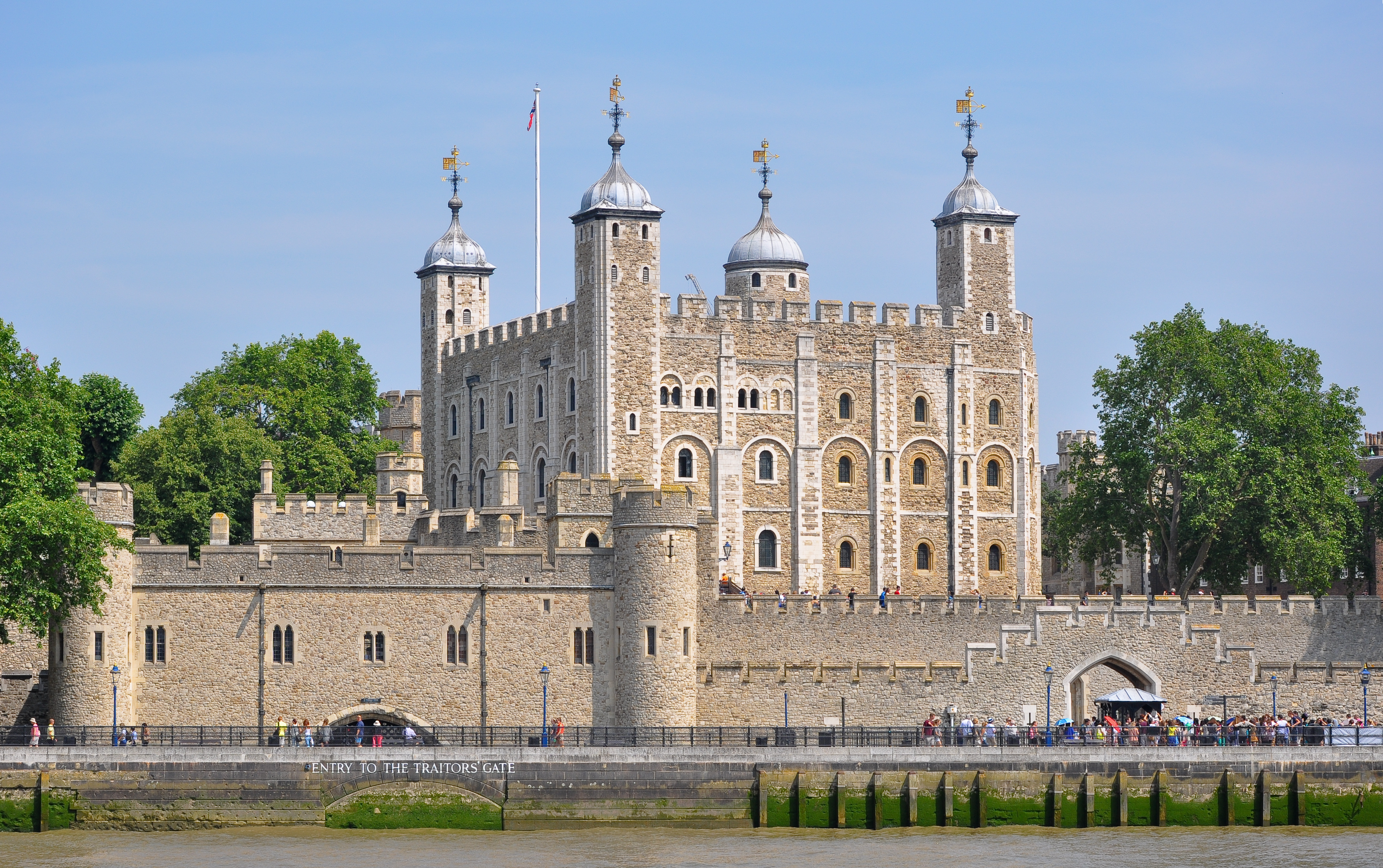
- The Tower of London
- Area
  - Coordinates: 51.5080°N 0.0762°W
- Population
  - 1831: 4,190
- Government: Tower Liberty Quarter Sessions
  - Type: Quarter sessions court
  - HQ: Court House, Wellclose Square
- Subdivisions
  - Type: Places
  - Units: 1. Tower Within; 2. Old Tower Without; 3. Great Tower Hill; 4. Little Minories (1686–1894); 5. Old Artillery Ground (1686–1894); 6. Wellclose (1686–1894)

The Liberties of the Tower, or the Tower Liberty, was a liberty in the London Borough of Tower Hamlets, Central London, which includes both Tower Hill and the Tower of London. The area was defined sometime after 1200 to provide an open area around the Tower to ensure its defensibility. The liberty was an independent administrative unit from then until it was formally abolished on 25 June 1894. The district maintains a ceremonial existence, with its custom of beating the bounds being a particularly well known example of the tradition.

== History ==
The liberty was founded sometime after 1200, from land that had previously part of the City of London.

=== Components and purpose ===
The area originally comprised three small liberties:

- Tower Within; The Tower, its moat and a small area of Tower Hill outside the city wall.
- Old Tower Without; on Tower Hill, outside the Tower and mostly within the city wall.
- Great Tower Hill; on Tower Hill, outside the Tower and inside the city wall.

In everyday speech, the term Great Tower Hill came to apply to Tower Hill inside the city wall, with Little Tower Hill referring to the area outside the wall. The presence of a unit called Great Tower Hill which covered only part of the area inside the city wall would later cause legal confusion.

The liberties had an administration separate from the neighbouring county and city, headed by the Constable of the Tower of London, appointed their own coroner, and had their own courthouse with general and quarter sessions and gaol. A force of constables was appointed for the area. The inhabitants had certain other privileges such as being able to claim any beast that fell from, and any swans under, London Bridge. The boundaries were presented by a Leet Jury in 1525, and again as surveyed by Haiward and Gascoyne in 1597.

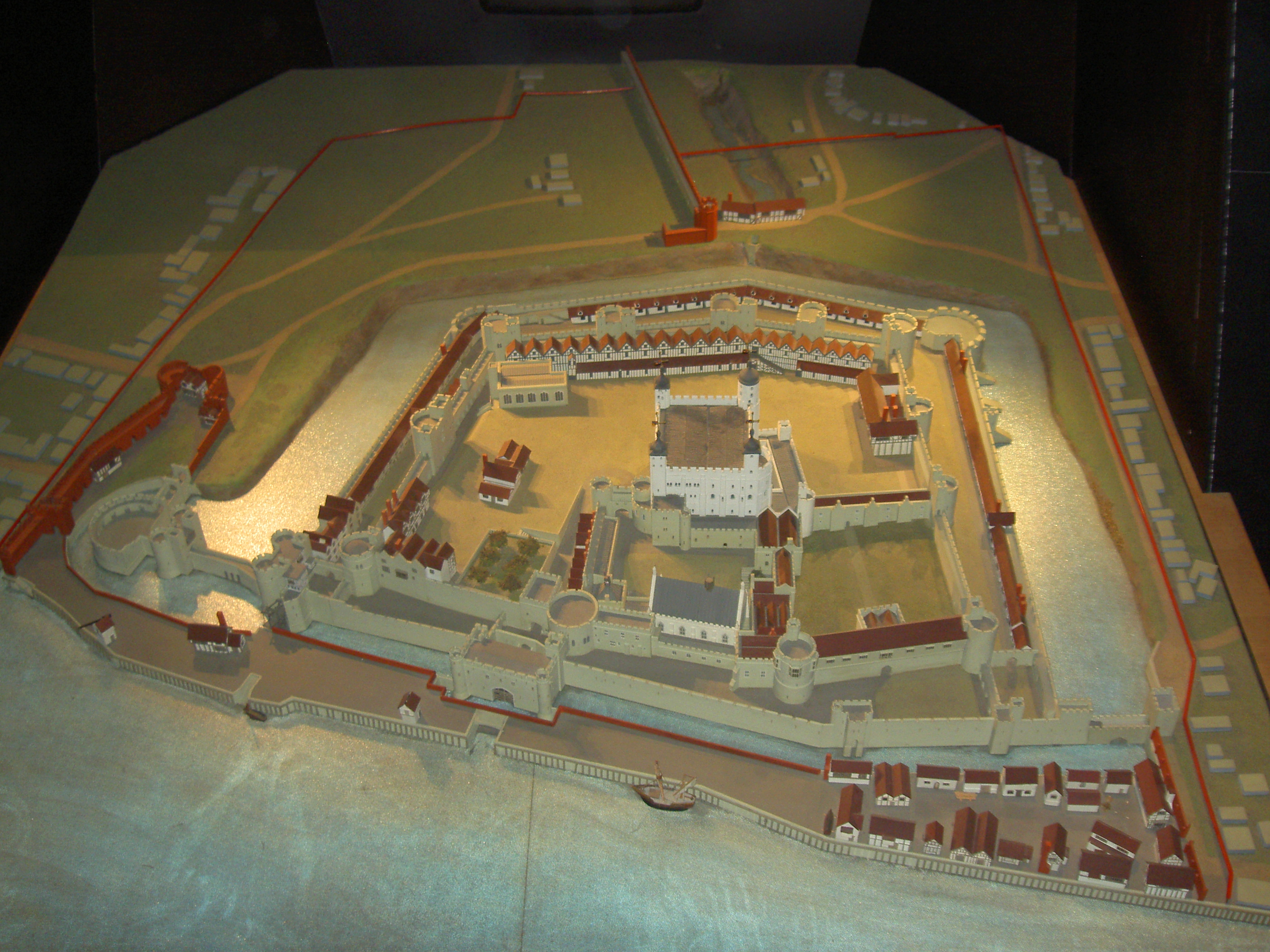
Scale Model Of The Tower Of London. The City Wall is shown joining the moat to the north, while the boundaries of the Tower Liberty are shown in red.

From the mid-seventeenth century, the liberty was part of a larger liberty, the Tower Division or Tower Hamlets which was independent of the county of Middlesex, carrying out Hundred and County responsibilities locally.

=== Expansion and evolution ===
The area of the liberty expanded in 1686, when letters patent granted by James II added three small exclaves; the Old Artillery Ground, Little Minories and the Liberty of Wellclose. These areas had come into the possession of the Crown when the religious houses that formerly administered them were dissolved. They were subsequently used for the storing of ordnance.

From 1837, the liberty formed part of the Whitechapel Poor Law Union, a grouping of administrative areas that combined for the purposes of administering poor relief. From 1855, the area became part of the Whitechapel District for certain local government purposes.

=== Administrative function phased out ===
Extra-parochial places were progressively eliminated and following the Extra-Parochial Places Act 1857, the Tower of London and Old Tower Without became civil parishes in 1858. The Old Artillery Ground became a civil parish in 1866, following the Poor Law Amendment Act 1867.

The liberty had become obsolete by 1889 when it became part of the County of London. It was thought that the Local Government Act 1888 had removed the jurisdiction of the justices. However, the charter was found to be still in operation. The liberty was abolished on 25 June 1894, following a petition by the justices of the peace of the County of London under the Liberties Act 1850. The Whitechapel District was dissolved in 1900 and local government functions passed to the Metropolitan Borough of Stepney.

The liberty continued as a franchise coroner's district. The Coroners (Amendment) Act 1926 (16 & 17 Geo. 5. c. 59) provided that the district could be dissolved when a vacancy arose; when a vacancy occurred on 10 May 1939, an order was made on 30 November 1939 combining it with the east district. This came into effect on 1 January 1940.

Since 1965 it has formed part of the London Borough of Tower Hamlets in Greater London. Following boundary changes around the Minories in 1994, small parts are now in the City of London.

=== Historic population data ===
The population was 3,995 in 1811 and 4,190 in 1831, the large majority of these people living in the former exclaves.

== Myth and legend ==
The importance of the Tower has given its locality an important place in the wider national consciousness. The head of Brân the Blessed, a legendary giant, and King of Britain was said to have been buried on the White Hill, identified with either Tower Hill or the spot where the White Tower now stands, facing France, in order that its power would ward of invasion, particularly from that direction. As long as it remained there, Britain would be safe from invasion. This myth is connected with the Celtic cult of the head. However, a jealous King Arthur dug up the head, declaring the country would be protected only by his great strength, and this mistake led to the success of the Anglo-Saxon invasions.

The name Brân is Welsh, and translates to English as crow or raven; leading to comparisons with the ravens of the Tower of London. It is said that if the ravens were to leave, the Tower, the Crown and Britain itself would fall.

== Beating the bounds ==
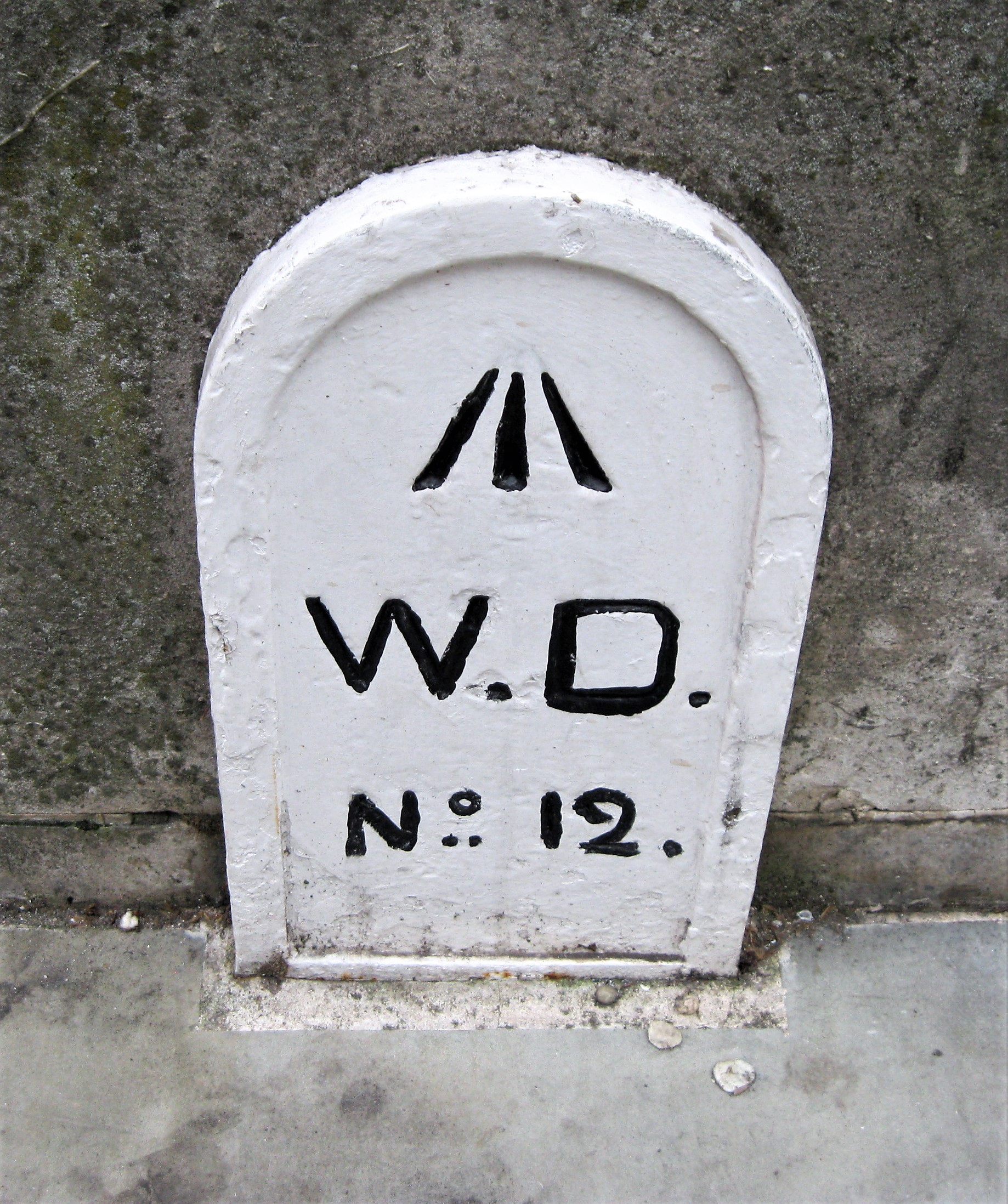
A marker for the "Beating the Bounds" ceremony

The history of the liberty is still recognised in a triennial ceremony of beating the bounds organised jointly by The Tower authorities and the local parish of All Hallows by the Tower every third Ascension Day. Ascension Day, or Holy Thursday, is a feast which falls 39 days after Easter Sunday.

The party moves along the Liberty's 31 boundary stones; at each one the Chaplain exclaims “Cursed is he who removeth his neighbours landmark”. The chief warder then says “Whack it boys, whack it” and the children beat the marker bounds with their willow wands. Children take part in such ceremonies because they will have the longest recollections of them, carrying the detailed knowledge of their neighbourhood throughout their lifetime.

The boundary includes the inlet known as Tower Dock. The ceremony is referred to in the name of 'The Liberty Bounds' public house (Wetherspoons) in the former General Steam Navigation Company's headquarters on the corner of Byward Street and Trinity Square.

== Open spaces ==
=== Tower Hill ===
- Trinity Square Gardens – including the Tower Hill Memorial to merchant seamen. The gardens are positioned on the site of the execution of many high-status prisoners.
- Wakefield Gardens
- Tower Gardens

=== Tower of London ===
- Tower Moat
- Tower Green. Another site of several high-status executions.

=== Tower Beach ===
The Tower Beach was established in 1934, on the riverfront between Tower Dock and Tower Bridge, to give local East Enders a recreational resource. Intended to last in perpetuity, the beach closed in 1971 due to pollution concerns.

== Notable structures ==
- Tower of London
- Tower Subway

== Notable people ==
As well as many well-known members of the Tower of London community, the Liberties have also been home to:

- Admiral William Penn lived in the area, and his son William Penn, the founder of Pennsylvania was born in the Liberty. Their residence was "on the east side, within a court adjoining to London Wall".
- Tubby Clayton, Anglican clergyman and founder of Toc H.
