= Unreformed boroughs in England and Wales 1835–1886 =

Unreformed boroughs were those corporate towns in England and Wales which had not been reformed by the Municipal Corporations Act 1835 (5 & 6 Will. 4. c. 76). A handful of these obtained new charters under the 1835 act. A royal commission was established in 1876 to inquire into these boroughs, and legislation passed in 1883 finally forced the reform or dissolution of these corporations by 1886.

== Boroughs reformed 1835–1881 ==
Only nine unreformed boroughs obtained new charters under the Municipal Corporations Act 1835 (5 & 6 Will. 4. c. 76):

Borough	Year
Honiton, Devon	1846
Hartlepool, County Durham	1850
Yeovil, Somerset	1854
Aberavon, Glamorgan	1861
Hedon, Yorkshire	1861
Reigate, Surrey	1863
Dunstable, Bedfordshire	1864
Conwy (Conway), Caernarfonshire	1877
Lewes, Sussex	1881

Three other towns incorporated in this period are sometimes listed as unreformed boroughs. The first of these was Ashton-under-Lyne, Lancashire, incorporated in 1847. Although it may have had an existence as a municipality, it had ceased to exist by the nineteenth century. Peterborough, in Northamptonshire and Huntingdonshire, was incorporated in 1874. The town was governed by officials of the dean and diocese of Peterborough. Taunton, in Somerset, whose charter had been nullified in 1792 due to a failure to fill vacancies in the corporation, continued as a parliamentary borough and the town was incorporated as a municipal borough in 1877.

== The royal commission of 1876 ==
The Royal Commission on Unreformed Municipal Corporations was appointed in 1876. It investigated the unreformed boroughs and made recommendations on which towns might be brought under the Municipal Corporations Act 1835 (5 & 6 Will. 4. c. 76).

The commissioners identified 75 towns with corporations still functioning, and recommended that 26 of them should be reformed, the others being abolished. They also named a further 32 towns in which the corporation had become extinct, although the boroughs still had a legal existence. Of these, 10 had ceased to operate since 1835.

The commissioners' report was not acted upon for seven years. In the meantime, one of the towns they considered suitable for municipal government, Lewes was reformed, and the 1835 legislation was replaced by the Municipal Corporations Act 1882 (45 & 46 Vict. c. 50).

== Municipal Corporations Act 1883 ==
Municipal Corporations Act 1883 (Note: Section 1.)
- Act of Parliament
- Parliament of the United Kingdom
- Long title: An Act to make provision respecting certain Municipal Corporations and other Local Authorities not subject to the Municipal Corporation Act.
- Citation: 46 & 47 Vict. c. 18
- Territorial extent: United Kingdom

Dates
- Royal assent: 29 June 1883
- Commencement: 29 June 1883 (Note: The Acts of Parliament (Commencement) Act 1793.)
Other legislation
Repeals/revokes	Borough Rates (England) Act 1854
Amended by	Statute Law Revision Act 1898; Local Government Act 1933; Representation of the People Act 1949; Justices of the Peace Act 1949; Charities Act 1960; Courts Act 1971; Local Authorities etc. (Miscellaneous Provision) (No. 4) Order 1974; Statute Law (Repeals) Act 1975; Administration of Justice Act 1977; Statute Law (Repeals) Act 1978

Status: Partially repealed

Text of statute as originally enacted

Revised text of statute as amended

Text of the Municipal Corporations Act 1883 as in force today (including any amendments) within the United Kingdom, from legislation.gov.uk.

The Municipal Corporations Act 1883 (46 & 47 Vict. c. 18) provided for the abolition of unreformed borough corporations, unless they obtained a new charter under the 1882 legislation.

Section 3 stated that “The place shall not be a corporate town or borough, and any municipal or other corporation thereof existing shall be dissolved” if a new charter had not been obtained by 29 September 1886.

The first and second schedules listed the corporations investigated by the 1876 commission. The successors are municipal boroughs, local government districts, rural sanitary districts and improvement commissioners districts.

Corporation or reputed corporation	County	Commissioners’ report	Fate of corporation	Successor
Aldeburgh	Suffolk	Recommended reform	Reformed 1885	Aldeburgh MB
Alnwick	Northumberland	Recommended reform	Abolished 1886	Alnwick LGD
Alresford	Hampshire	Recommended abolition	Abolished 1886	absorbed by Alresford RSD
Altrincham	Cheshire	Recommended abolition	Abolished 1886 (Note: The offices of mayor of Altrincham, Over and Newport, Pembrokeshire were deemed to be "purely honorary" and were to be allowed to continue to exist. In each case, the mayor was appointed by the lord of the manor and court leet.)	Altrincham LGD
Appleby	Westmorland	Recommended reform	Reformed 1885	Appleby MB
Axbridge	Somerset	Recommended abolition	Abolished 1886	absorbed by Axbridge RSD
Bala	Merionethshire	Long extinct	Abolished 1886	Bala LGD
Bangor	Caernarfonshire	Long extinct	Reformed 1883	Bangor MB
Berkeley	Gloucestershire	Recommended abolition	Abolished 1886	absorbed by Thornbury RSD
Bishops Castle	Shropshire	Recommended reform	Reformed 1885	Bishop's Castle MB
Bossiney	Cornwall	Extinct since 1835	Abolished 1886	absorbed by Camelford RSD
Bovey Tracey	Devon	Recommended abolition	Abolished 1886	absorbed by Newton Abbot RSD
Brackley	Northamptonshire	Recommended abolition	Reformed 1886	Brackley MB
Brading	Hampshire (Isle of Wight)	Recommended abolition	Abolished 1886	absorbed by Isle of Wight RSD
Bradninch	Devon	Recommended reform	Abolished 1886	absorbed by Tiverton RSD
Bridlington	Yorkshire	Long extinct	Abolished 1886	Bridlington LGD
Caerwys	Flintshire	Extinct since 1835	Abolished 1886	absorbed by Holywell RSD
Camelford	Cornwall	Recommended abolition	Abolished 1886	absorbed by Camelford RSD
Castle Rising	Norfolk	Extinct since 1835	Abolished 1886	absorbed by Freebridge Lynn RSD
Chipping Campden	Gloucestershire	Recommended abolition	Abolished 1886	absorbed by Shipston on Stour RSD
Chipping Sodbury	Gloucestershire	Long extinct	Abolished 1886	absorbed by Chipping Sodbury RSD
Christchurch	Hampshire	Recommended reform	Reformed 1886	Christchurch MB
Clun	Shropshire	Extinct since 1835	Abolished 1886	absorbed by Clun RSD
Corfe Castle	Dorset	Recommended abolition	Abolished 1886	absorbed by Wareham & Purbeck RSD
Cowbridge	Glamorganshire	Recommended abolition	Abolished 1886	absorbed by Bridgend & Cowbridge RSD
Criccieth	Caernarfonshire	Long extinct	Abolished 1886	Criccieth ICD
Crickhowell	Brecknockshire	Long extinct	Abolished 1886	absorbed by Crickhowell RSD
Dinas Mawddwy	Merionethshire	Recommended abolition	Abolished 1886	absorbed by Dolgelley RSD
Dunwich	Suffolk	Recommended abolition	Abolished 1886	absorbed by Blything RSD
Dursley	Gloucestershire	Recommended abolition	Abolished 1886	absorbed by Dursley RSD
East Looe	Cornwall	Recommended abolition	Abolished 1886	absorbed by Liskeard RSD
Farnham	Surrey	Long extinct	Abolished 1886	Farnham LGD
Fishguard	Pembrokeshire	Long extinct	Abolished 1886	absorbed by Haverfordwest RSD
Fordwich	Kent	Recommended abolition	Abolished 1886	absorbed by Bridge RSD
Garstang	Lancashire	Recommended abolition	Abolished 1886	absorbed by Garstang RSD
Grampound	Cornwall	Long extinct	Abolished 1886	absorbed by St Austell RSD
Great Dunmow	Essex	Recommended abolition	Abolished 1886	absorbed by Dunmow RSD
Harlech	Merionethshire	Long extinct	Abolished 1886	absorbed by Ffestiniog RSD
Harton	Devon	Recommended abolition	Abolished 1886	absorbed by Bideford RSD
Hay	Brecknockshire	Long extinct	Abolished 1886	absorbed by Hay RSD
Havering-atte-Bower	Essex	Recommended abolition	Abolished 1886	absorbed by Romford RSD
Henley-on-Thames	Oxfordshire	Recommended reform	Reformed 1883	Henley-on-Thames MB
Higham Ferrers	Northamptonshire	Recommended abolition	Reformed 1886	Higham Ferrers MB
Holt	Denbighshire	Recommended abolition	Abolished 1886	absorbed by Wrexham RSD
Ilchester	Somerset	Recommended abolition	Abolished 1886	absorbed by Yeovil RSD
Kenfig	Glamorganshire	Recommended abolition	Abolished 1886	absorbed by Bridgend & Cowbridge RSD
Kidwelly	Carmarthenshire	Recommended reform	Reformed 1885	Kidwelly MB
Kilgerran	Pembrokeshire	Recommended abolition	Abolished 1886	absorbed by Cardigan RSD
Lampeter	Cardiganshire	Recommended abolition	Reformed 1884	Lampeter MB
Langport Eastover	Somerset	Recommended abolition	Abolished 1886	absorbed by Langport RSD
Laugharne	Carmarthenshire	Recommended abolition	Abolished 1886	absorbed by Carmarthen RSD
Llanelly	Carmarthenshire	Extinct since 1835	Abolished 1886	Llanelly LGD
Llanfyllin	Montgomeryshire	Recommended reform	Reformed 1885	Llanfyllin MB
Llantrisant	Glamorganshire	Recommended abolition	Abolished 1886	absorbed by Pontypridd RSD
Lostwithiel	Cornwall	Recommended reform	Reformed 1885	Lostwithiel MB
Loughor	Glamorganshire	Recommended abolition	Abolished 1886	absorbed by Llanelly RSD
Lydd	Kent	Recommended reform	Reformed 1885	Lydd MB
Machynlleth	Montgomeryshire	Long extinct	Abolished 1886	absorbed by Machynlleth RSD
Malmesbury	Wiltshire	Recommended reform	Reformed 1886	Malmesbury MB
Marazion	Cornwall	Recommended abolition	Abolished 1886	absorbed by Penzance RSD
Midhurst	Sussex	Long extinct	Abolished 1886	absorbed by Midhurst RSD
Montgomery	Montgomeryshire	Recommended reform	Reformed 1885	Montgomery MB
Nevin	Caernarfonshire	Recommended abolition	Abolished 1886	absorbed by Pwllheli RSD
New Romney	Kent	Recommended reform	Reformed 1885	New Romney MB
Newborough	Anglesey	Long extinct	Abolished 1886	absorbed by Carnarvon RSD
Newport	Shropshire	Recommended abolition	Abolished 1886	Newport LGD
Newport	Pembrokeshire	Recommended abolition	Abolished 1886	absorbed by Cardigan RSD
Newton	Lancashire	Long extinct	Abolished 1886	Newton in Makerfield LGD
Newtown	Hampshire (Isle of Wight)	Extinct since 1835	Abolished 1886	absorbed by Isle of Wight RSD
Okehampton	Devon	Recommended reform	Reformed 1885	Okehampton MB
Orford	Suffolk	Recommended abolition	Abolished 1886	absorbed by Plomesgate RSD
Over	Cheshire	Recommended reform	Abolished 1886	Winsford LGD
Overton	Flintshire	Recommended abolition	Abolished 1886	absorbed by Ellesmere RSD
Petersfield	Hampshire	Recommended abolition	Abolished 1886	absorbed by Petersfield RSD
Pevensey	Sussex	Recommended abolition	Abolished 1886	absorbed by Eastbourne RSD
Plympton Earle	Devon	Extinct since 1835	Abolished 1886	absorbed by Plympton St Mary RSD
Presteigne	Radnorshire	Long extinct	Abolished 1886	absorbed by Knighton RSD
Rhuddlan	Flintshire	Extinct since 1835	Abolished 1886	absorbed by St Asaph RSD
Queenborough	Kent	Recommended reform	Reformed 1885	Queenborough MB
Radnor	Radnorshire	Recommended reform	Abolished 1886	absorbed by Kington RSD
Romney Marsh	Kent	Recommended abolition	Abolished 1886	absorbed by Romney Marsh RSD
Ruyton	Shropshire	Long extinct	Abolished 1886	absorbed by Oswestry RSD
St Clears	Carmarthenshire	Recommended abolition	Abolished 1886	absorbed by Carmarthen RSD
St David's	Pembrokeshire	Long extinct	Abolished 1886	absorbed by Haverfordwest RSD
Saltash	Cornwall	Recommended reform	Reformed 1885	Saltash MB
Seaford	Sussex	Recommended abolition	Abolished 1886	Seaford LGD
Sutton Coldfield	Warwickshire	Recommended reform	Reformed 1885	Sutton Coldfield MB
Tavistock	Devon	Long extinct	Abolished 1886	absorbed by Tavistock RSD
Thornbury	Gloucestershire	Recommended abolition	Abolished 1886	absorbed by Thornbury RSD
Tregony	Cornwall	Extinct since 1835	Abolished 1886	absorbed by Truro RSD
Usk	Monmouthshire	Recommended abolition	Abolished 1886	Usk LGD
Wareham	Dorset	Recommended reform	Reformed 1886	Wareham MB
Weobley	Herefordshire	Long extinct	Abolished 1886	absorbed by Weobley RSD
Westbury	Wiltshire	Recommended abolition	Abolished 1886	absorbed by Westbury & Whorwellsdown RSD
West Looe	Cornwall	Extinct since 1835	Abolished 1886	absorbed by Liskeard RSD
Wickwar	Gloucestershire	Recommended abolition	Abolished 1886	absorbed by Chipping Sodbury RSD
Wilton	Wiltshire	Recommended reform	Reformed 1885	Wilton MB
Winchcomb	Gloucestershire	Recommended abolition	Abolished 1886	absorbed by Winchcomb RSD
Winchelsea	Sussex	Recommended abolition	Abolished 1886	absorbed by Rye RSD
Wiston	Pembrokeshire	Long extinct	Abolished 1886	absorbed by Haverfordwest RSD
Wokingham	Berkshire	Recommended reform	Reformed 1883	Wokingham MB
Woodstock	Oxfordshire	Recommended reform	Reformed 1886	Woodstock MB
Wootton Bassett	Wiltshire	Recommended reform	Abolished 1886	absorbed by Cricklade & Wootton Bassett RSD
Wotton-under-Edge	Gloucestershire	Recommended abolition	Abolished 1886	absorbed by Dursley RSD
Yarmouth	Hampshire (Isle of Wight)	Recommended abolition	Abolished 1886	absorbed by Isle of Wight RSD

A number of the boroughs abolished in 1886 subsequently regained borough status, the earliest being Cowbridge in 1887. When such boroughs were created, however, they were entirely new creations with no claim to the former property of the abolished boroughs.

=== Other provisions ===
The 1886 act also dealt with a number of other corporations with a status similar to boroughs:

- The Confederation of the Cinque Ports were to retain their privileges in those towns with a reformed corporation. Non-corporate members were to be merged with the county and hundred in which they lay geographically. The corporation of the ancient town of Winchelsea was to become a charitable trust.
- The corporation of the bailiff jurats and commonalty of Romney Marsh was to continue to exist, but would only exercise such non-municipal powers.
- The Liberties Act 1850 (13 & 14 Vict. c. 105) would be extended to the Liberty of Havering atte Bower, allowing for its merger with the county of Essex.

== Bibliography ==
- Commissioners Appointed to Inquire into Municipal Corporations not subject to the Municipal Corporations Acts (other than the City of London) (1880). Report; together with minutes of evidence, index, &c. Command papers. Vol. C.2490. Eyre and Spottiswoode for HMSO.
