= Tower Beach =

Tower Beach may refer to:

- Tower Beach, a small beach north of Wreck Beach near Vancouver, British Columbia, Canada
- Tower Beach, a former name for a portion of Fort Walton Beach, Florida, United States
- Tower Beach, London, a former urban beach next to the Tower of London, United Kingdom
