= Old Tower Without =

Coordinates: 51°30′35.48″N 0°4′35.54″W

- Civil parish
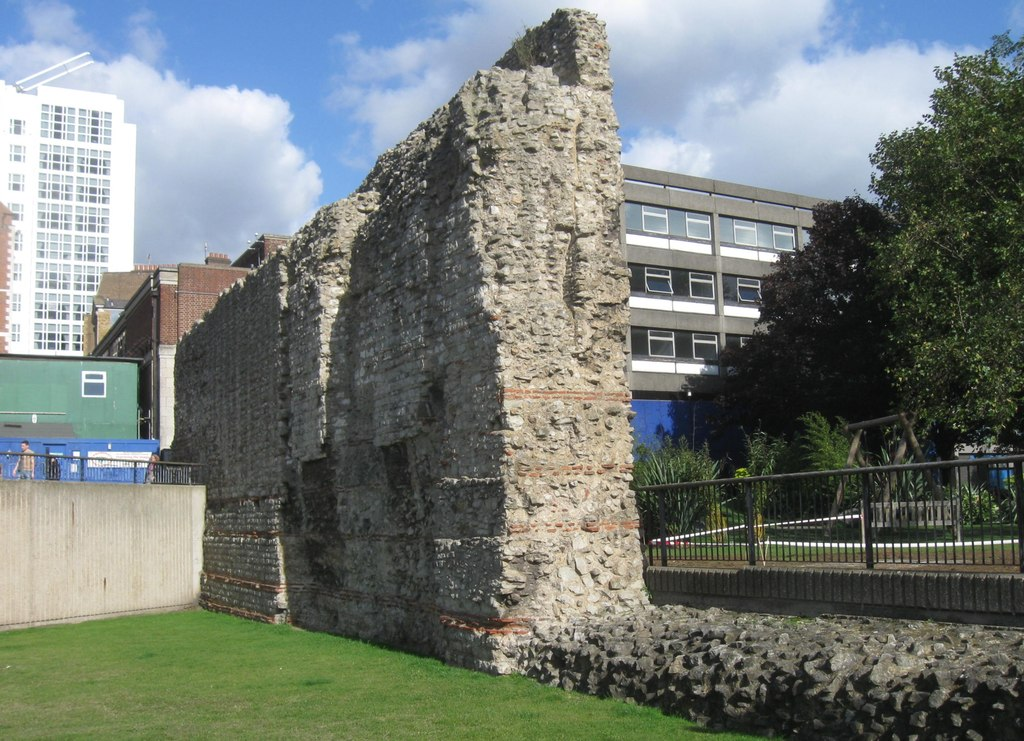
- Area
  - 1891: 6 acres (0.024 km^{2})
- Population
  - 1891: 65
- History
  - Abolished: 1 October 1895
  - Succeeded by: St Botolph Without Aldgate

Old Tower Without was an extra-parochial area, usually described as a "precinct", and after 1858 a civil parish in the metropolitan area of London, England.

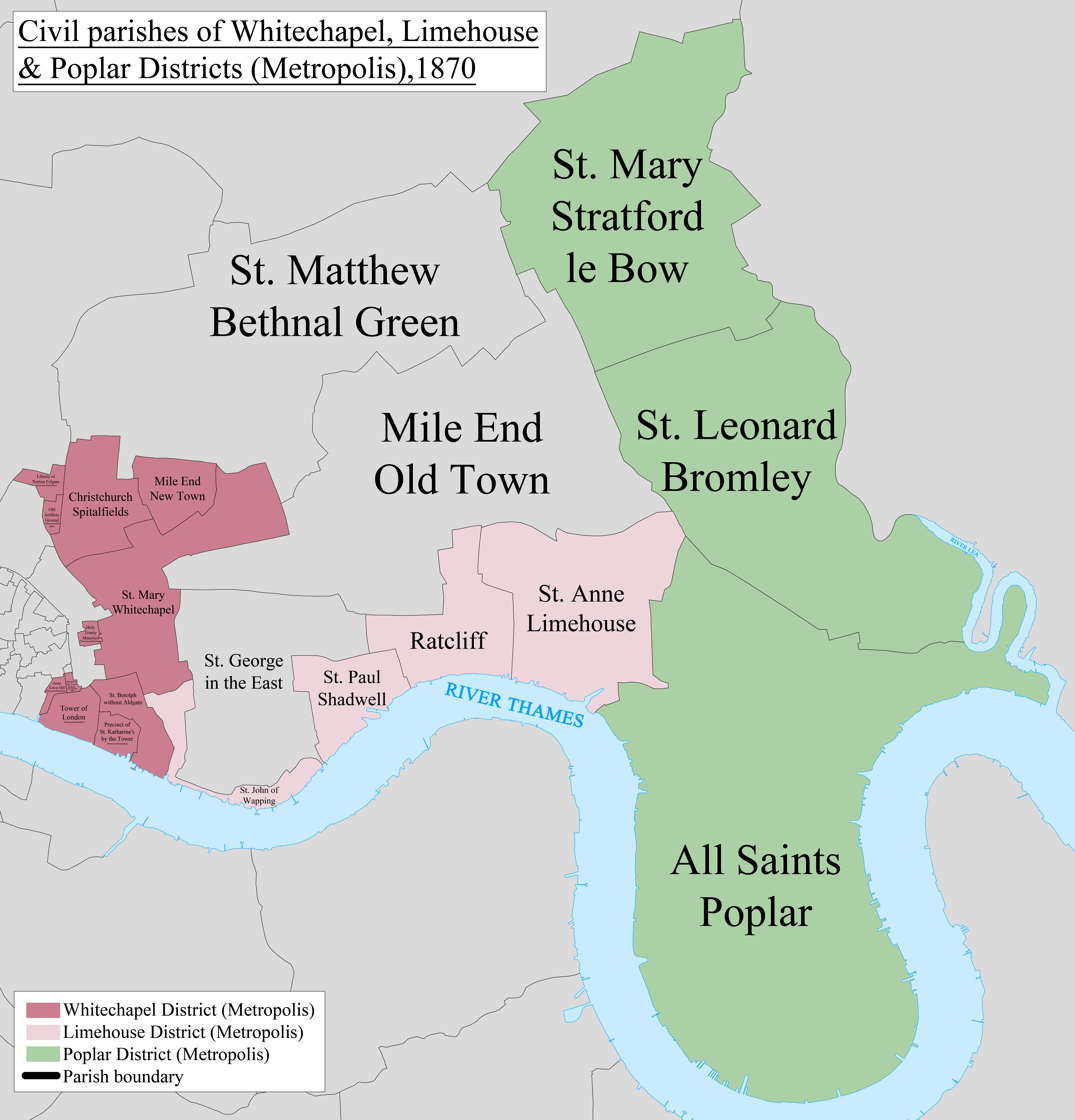
A map showing the civil parish boundaries in 1870.

Old Tower Without was outside the jurisdiction of either the City of London or the County of Middlesex, and was within the Liberty of the Tower which had a separate county administration and court of quarter sessions.

It was within the bills of mortality area but did not give returns of burials and baptisms.

It became part of the Whitechapel Poor Law Union in 1837. Under the Metropolis Management Act 1855 it was grouped into the Whitechapel District as the "District of Tower". This was later interpreted to mean it included the extra-parochial place of Great Tower Hill.

In 1889 it became part of the County of London and the Liberty of the Tower was dissolved in 1894. The parish of Old Tower Without was abolished on 1 October 1895 and became part of St Botolph Without Aldgate. At the 1891 census (the last before the abolition of the parish), Old Tower Without had a population of 65.

== Population ==
The population at the decennial census was:

Year	1801	1811	1821	1831	1841	1851	1871	1881	1891
Population	563	775	205	280	310	285	308	233	65
