= Whitechapel District (Metropolis) =

Former local government district in London, England

Whitechapel
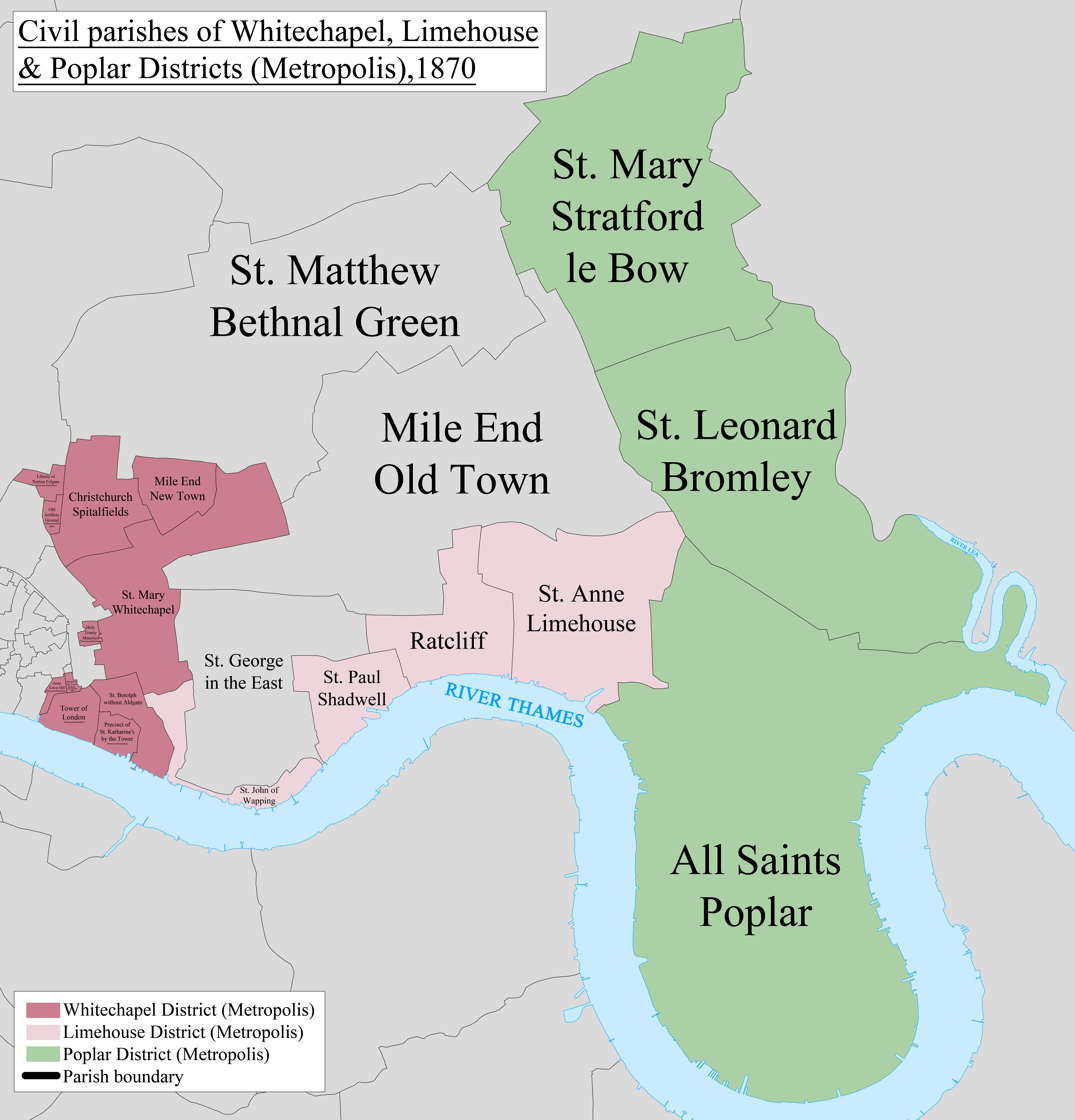
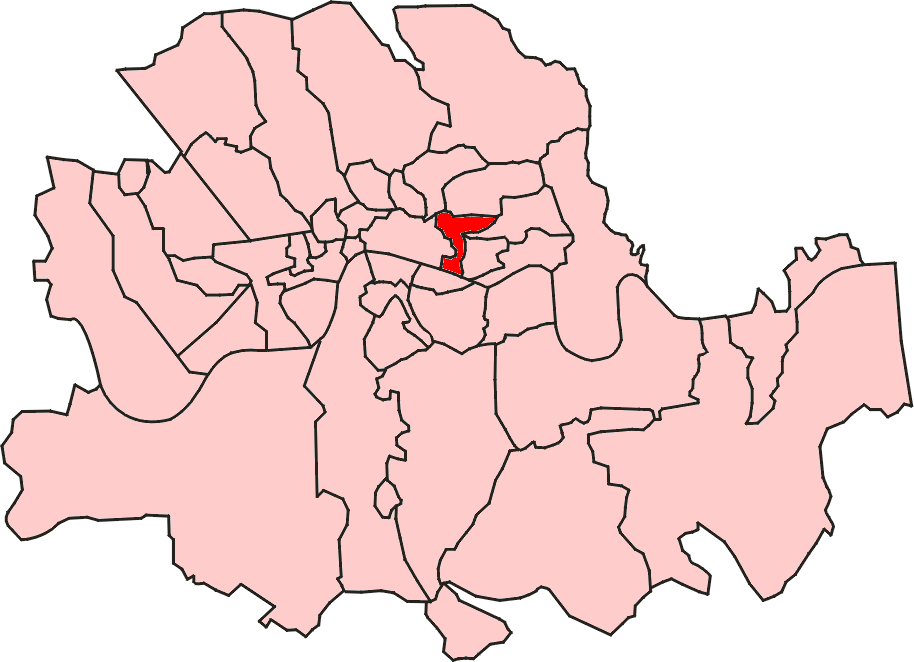
- Area
  - 1891: 357 acres (1.44 km^{2})
- Population
  - 1891: 74,420
- Density
  - 1891: 208/acre
- History
  - Created: 1855
  - Abolished: 1900
  - Succeeded by: Metropolitan Borough of Stepney
- Status: District
- Government: Whitechapel District Board of Works

Whitechapel was a local government district within the metropolitan area of London, England from 1855 to 1900.

== History ==
The district was formed by the Metropolis Management Act 1855 and was governed by the Whitechapel District Board of Works, which consisted of 58 elected vestrymen. The district contained a number of small parishes in the East End of London that were considered too small to be self governing.

Until 1889 the district was in the county of Middlesex, but included in the area of the Metropolitan Board of Works. In 1889 the area of the MBW was constituted the County of London, and the district board became a local authority under the London County Council.

== Governance ==
The district comprised the following civil parishes. The main function of the parish vestries within the district was to elect the 58 members of the Whitechapel District Board of Works.

The parishes (and number of district board members elected) were:

- Mile End New Town (6)
- Minories Holy Trinity (1)
- Norton Folgate (3)
- Old Artillery Ground (1)
- Precinct of St Katherine (1)
- St Botolph without Aldgate (section in Middlesex) (6)
- Spitalfields Christchurch (12)
- District of Tower (1)
- Whitechapel St Mary (27)

The 1855 legislation included the "District of Tower" as part of the Whitechapel District. The Great Tower Hill Act 1869 interpretation of this was Old Tower Without, including within it Great Tower Hill.

Under the Metropolis Management Act 1855 any parish that exceeded 2,000 ratepayers was to be divided into wards; as such the parish of St Mary Whitechapel within the Whitechapel District Boards of Works was divided into three wards (electing vestrymen): No. 1 or East (15), No. 2 or Middle (9) and No. 3 or South (12).

The district board elected one member of the Metropolitan Board of Works.

== Abolition ==
The district was abolished in 1900 and became part of the Metropolitan Borough of Stepney.
