= Tower Hill =

Area of London, England

Coordinates: 51.5085°N 0.0782°W

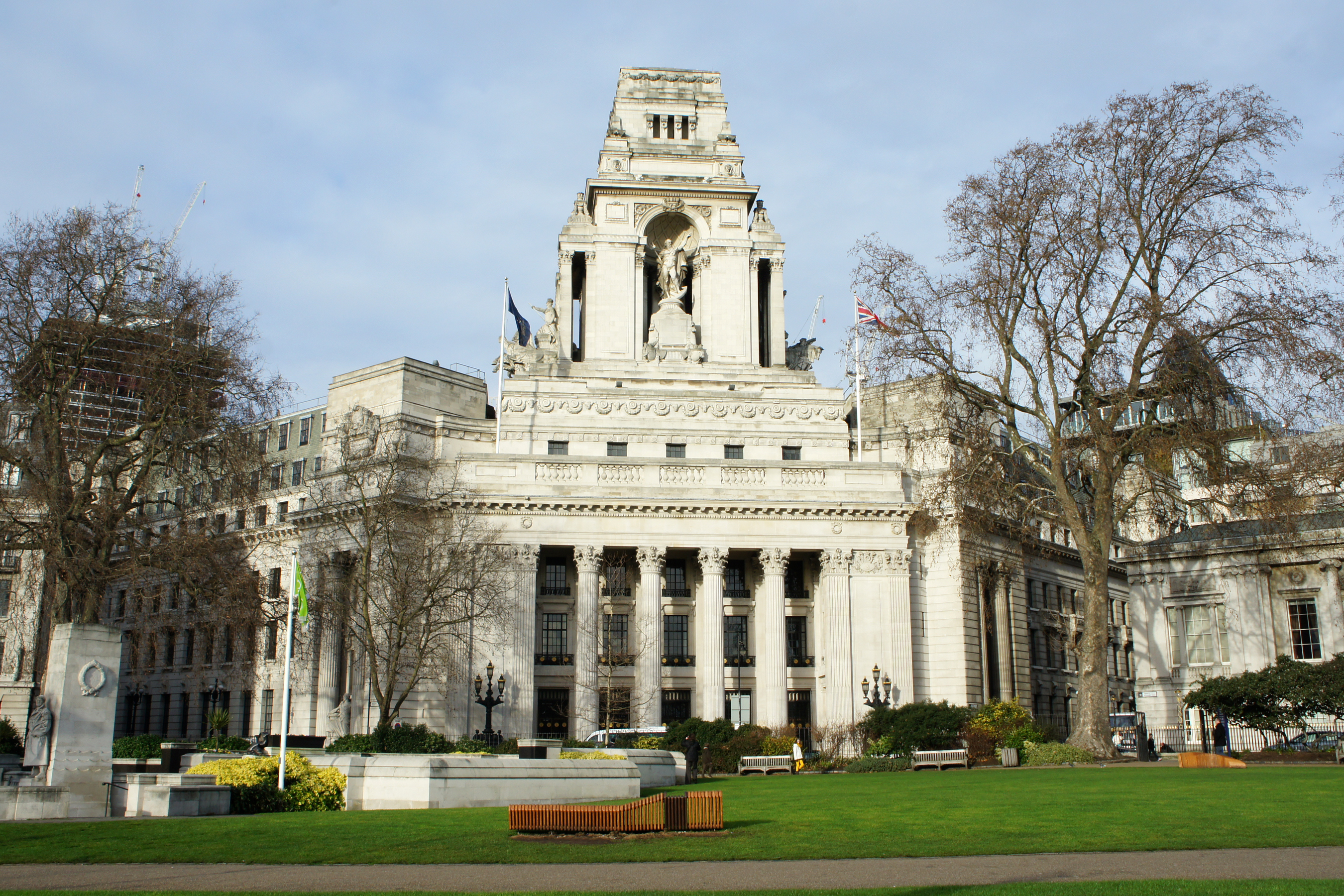
- 10 Trinity Square, Tower Hill

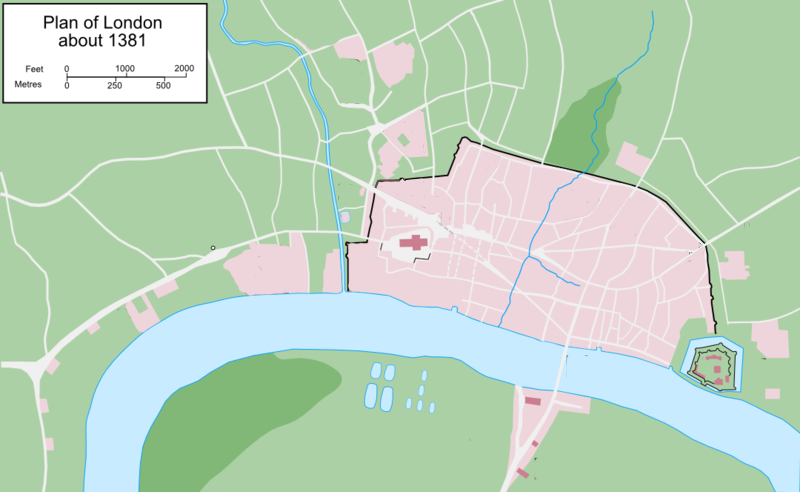
- Location within Greater London
- OS grid reference: TQ333806
  - Charing Cross: 2 mi (3.2 km) W
- London borough: Tower Hamlets
- Ceremonial county: Greater London
- Region: London
- Country: England
- Sovereign state: United Kingdom
- Post town: LONDON
- Postcode district: EC3N
- Dialling code: 020
- Police: Metropolitan
- Fire: London
- Ambulance: London
- UK Parliament: Poplar and Limehouse
- London Assembly: City and East

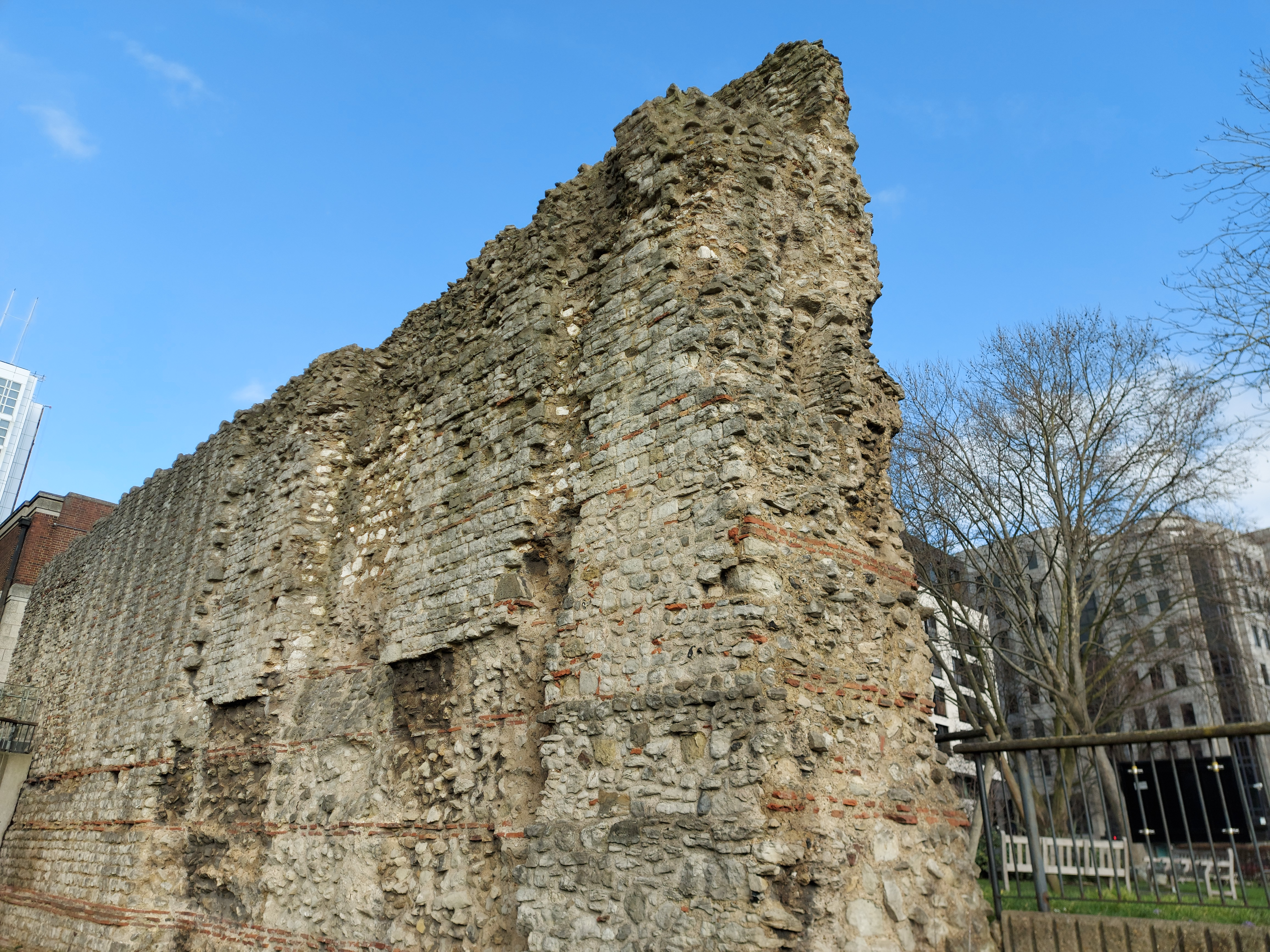
A surviving section of Roman wall on Tower Hill. Great Tower Hill lay inside the wall, Little Tower Hill outside.

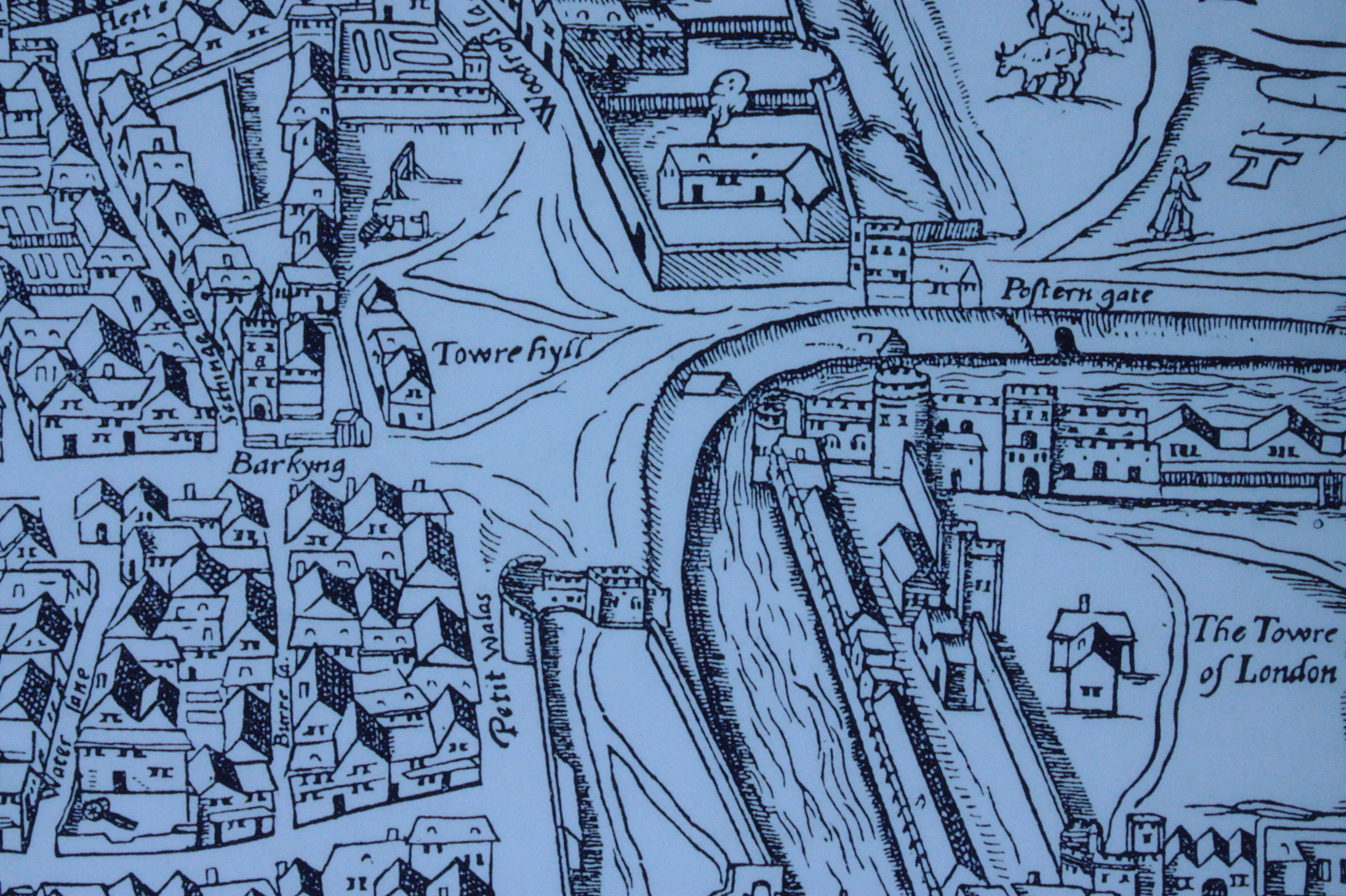
Tower Hill as shown on the "Woodcut" map of c. 1561

Tower Hill is the area surrounding the Tower of London in the London Borough of Tower Hamlets. It is infamous for the public execution of high status prisoners from the late 14th to the mid 18th century. The execution site on the higher ground north-west of the Tower of London moat is now occupied by Trinity Square Gardens.

Tower Hill rises from the north bank of the River Thames to reach a maximum height of 14.5 metres (48 ft) ordnance datum. The land was historically part of the Liberties of the Tower of London, an area the Tower authorities controlled to keep clear of any development which would reduce the defensibility of the Tower. Building has encroached to a degree, but a legacy of this control is that much of the hill is still open. The hill includes land on either side of the London Wall, a large remnant of which is visible.

== Definition ==
Generally speaking, the name Tower Hill informally applies to those parts of the Tower Liberty that are outside the Tower of London and its moat. Great Tower Hill is the land lying inside (or west) of the line of the London Wall whereas Little Tower Hill is the land outside (or east) of the wall.

== Toponymy ==
The first known use of the name 'Tower Hill' was as Tourhulle in 1343. Earlier British legends relating to the area refer to it as White Hill.

== Public executions ==
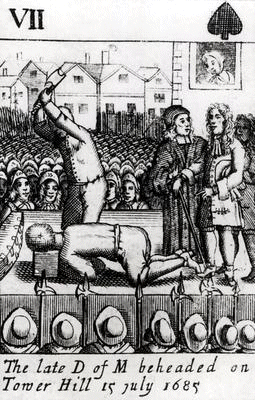
Depiction of the 1685 execution of James Scott, 1st Duke of Monmouth at Tower Hill in a popular print.

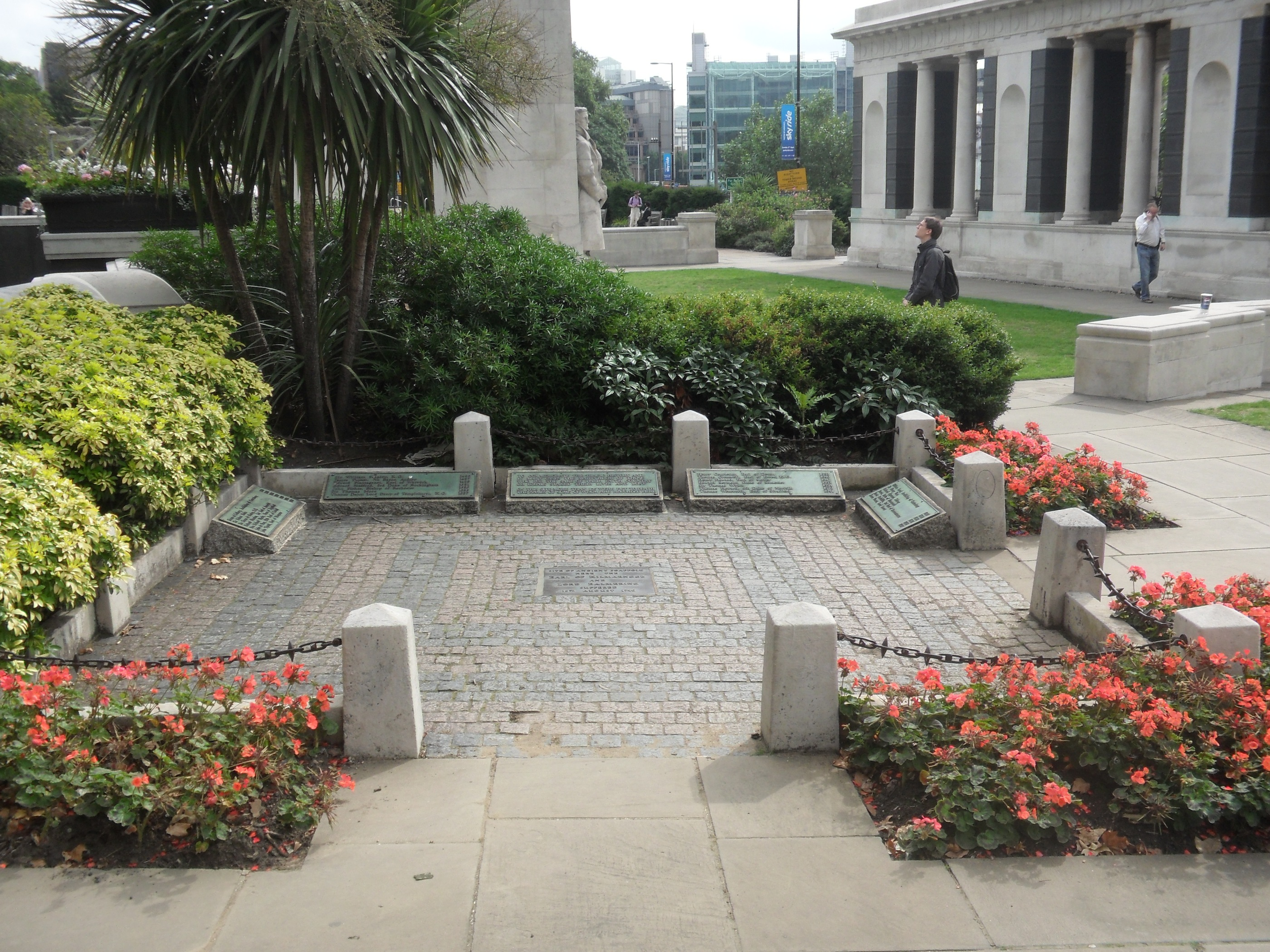
The Tower Hill Memorial, marking the site of the Scaffold

Public executions of high-profile traitors and criminals, often attainted peers, as well as innocent Catholics in the 16th century, were carried out on Tower Hill (some others were carried out within the confines of the Tower of London itself). The backgrounds to those carried out at Tower Hill ranged from the Peasants' Revolt of 1381 to the Wars of the Roses; Lollardism; claims to the throne by Perkin Warbeck and Lambert Simnel; the English Reformation; the Pilgrimage of Grace; the Monmouth Rebellion; the Jacobite Rising; and the Gordon Riots of 1780. Lord Lovat's execution for high treason in 1747 was the last judicial beheading in England while the final executions on Tower Hill were hangings in 1780. Some 120 executions are chronicled and they include:-

- 1381 – Simon Sudbury, Archbishop of Canterbury (beheaded by an angry mob)
- 1381 – Sir Robert Hales
- 1388 – Sir Simon de Burley
- 1388 – John de Beauchamp, 1st Baron Beauchamp (fourth creation)
- 1397 – Richard Fitzalan, 11th Earl of Arundel
- 1440 – Rev. Richard Wyche, Vicar of Deptford
- 1462 – John de Vere, 12th Earl of Oxford
- 1462 – Aubrey de Vere, eldest son and heir of John de Vere, 12th Earl of Oxford
- 1462 – Sir Thomas Tuddenham
- 1462 – William Tyrrell
- 1462 – John Montgomery
- 1470 – John Tiptoft, 1st Earl of Worcester
- 1495 – Sir William Stanley
- 1497 – James Tuchet, a commander of the Cornish Rebellion of 1497
- 1499 – Edward Plantagenet, 17th Earl of Warwick
- 1502 – James Tyrrell
- 1510 – Edmund Dudley
- 1510 – Sir Richard Empson
- 1513 – Edmund de la Pole, 3rd Duke of Suffolk
- 1521 – Edward Stafford, 3rd Duke of Buckingham
- 1535 – John Fisher, Bishop of Rochester
- 1535 – Sir Thomas More, ex-Lord Chancellor
- 1536 – George Boleyn, brother of Anne Boleyn
- 1537 – Thomas Darcy, 1st Baron Darcy de Darcy
- 1538 – Henry Courtenay, Earl of Devon
- 1538 – Edward Neville
- 1539 – Sir Nicholas Carew
- 1539 – Henry Pole, 1st Baron Montagu
- 1540 – Thomas Cromwell, Earl of Essex
- 1540 – Walter Hungerford, 1st Baron Hungerford of Heytesbury
- 1547 – Henry Howard, Earl of Surrey
- 1549 – Thomas Seymour, 1st Baron Seymour of Sudeley
- 1552 – Sir Ralph Vane
- 1552 – Sir Thomas Arundell of Wardour Castle
- 1552 – Sir Michael Stanhope
- 1552 – Edward Seymour, 1st Duke of Somerset
- 1553 – John Dudley, 1st Duke of Northumberland
- 1554 – Sir Thomas Wyatt
- 1554 – Lord Guildford Dudley
- 1554 – Henry Grey, 1st Duke of Suffolk
- 1572 – Thomas Howard, 4th Duke of Norfolk
- 1601 – Sir Christopher Blount
- 1615 – Sir Gervase Helwys
- 1631 – Mervyn Tuchet, 2nd Earl of Castlehaven
- 1641 – Thomas Wentworth, 1st Earl of Strafford
- 1645 – William Laud, Archbishop of Canterbury
- 1651 – Christopher Love, Presbyterian minister
- 1662 – Sir Henry Vane
- 1683 – Col. Algernon Sidney
- 1685 – James Scott, 1st Duke of Monmouth
- 1687 – Sir John Fenwick, 3rd Baronet
- 1716 – James Radclyffe, 3rd Earl of Derwentwater
- 1716 – William Gordon, 6th Viscount of Kenmure
- 1746 – William Boyd, 4th Earl of Kilmarnock
- 1746 – Robert Boyd (of Clan Boyd)
- 1746 – Arthur Elphinstone, 6th Lord Balmerino
- 1747 – Simon Fraser, 11th Lord Lovat

== Trinity Square and Gardens ==
After the abandonment of Tower Hill as a site for public executions, Trinity Square and Gardens were laid out in 1797 by Samuel Wyatt as the setting for Trinity House, completed a year earlier as headquarters of the Corporation of Trinity House.

In the 1880s, a section of the London Underground Circle Line was constructed beneath Trinity Square Gardens. In the first decade of the 20th century small buildings, courts and yards bordering Trinity Square were cleared to make way for the construction of the Port of London Authority headquarters at 10 Trinity Square. Begun in 1912 and completed in 1922, the Grade II* building is now a Four Seasons hotel which opened as such on 26 January 2017.

The Merchant Navy Memorial, First World War section, Grade I-listed, was unveiled by Queen Mary (deputising for her husband, King George V) on 12 December 1928. To avoid overshadowing this, the Grade II* Second World War section is in the form of a sunken garden and was unveiled by The Queen on 5 December 1955 while that commemorating merchant seamen killed in the 1982 Falklands War was unveiled on 4 September 2005 by the First Sea Lord, Admiral Sir Alan West.

== Tower Hill Trust ==
In October 1933, Reverend P B ("Tubby") Clayton of All Hallows by the Tower and Dr B R Leftwich published "The Pageant of Tower Hill", which included the outline of a scheme to improve Tower Hill. In December 1933 the inaugural meeting of the Tower Hill Improvement Fund was held. Lord Wakefield was elected president and launched an appeal at the Guildhall in January 1934.

One of the Trust's first actions was to create a beach on the north bank of the Thames between St Katherine's Steps and the Tower for families from the East End.

In 1937 the Fund became the Tower Hill Improvement Trust and set about purchasing a number of buildings it considered eyesores. These were demolished in order to provide gardens and open public spaces. Among the buildings demolished was the giant Myer's tea warehouse, which stood next to All Hallows and blocked the view of the Tower from the west.

During 2001–2003 the Trust part-financed the refurbishment of Trinity Square Gardens.

In June 2006 the Trust's name was shortened to Tower Hill Trust.

== Tower Hill (the street) ==
The street of Tower Hill, within the London Borough of Tower Hamlets, adjoins the City of London at Byward Street and runs eastwards to Minories and Tower Bridge Approach. It replaced Postern Row in the 1880s and was widened and extended a decade later. Tower Hill is in the London congestion charge zone from its junction with Minories westwards.

A pedestrian subway links Tower Hill tube station to the boundary of the Tower of London where the remains of the south tower of the medieval postern gate are visible.

== Tower Hill Terrace and Tower Vaults ==
Tower Hill Terrace is the pedestrian way that runs south off Tower Hill to Gloucester Court and also the adjoining paved public space, redeveloped in 2019, atop the Tower Vaults shopping complex. A floor plaque in Tower Vaults commemorates its re-opening in 1991 as the surviving part of the 1864 George Myers built Mazawattee Tea Warehouse, extensively bomb-damaged in Second World War air raids and later demolished.

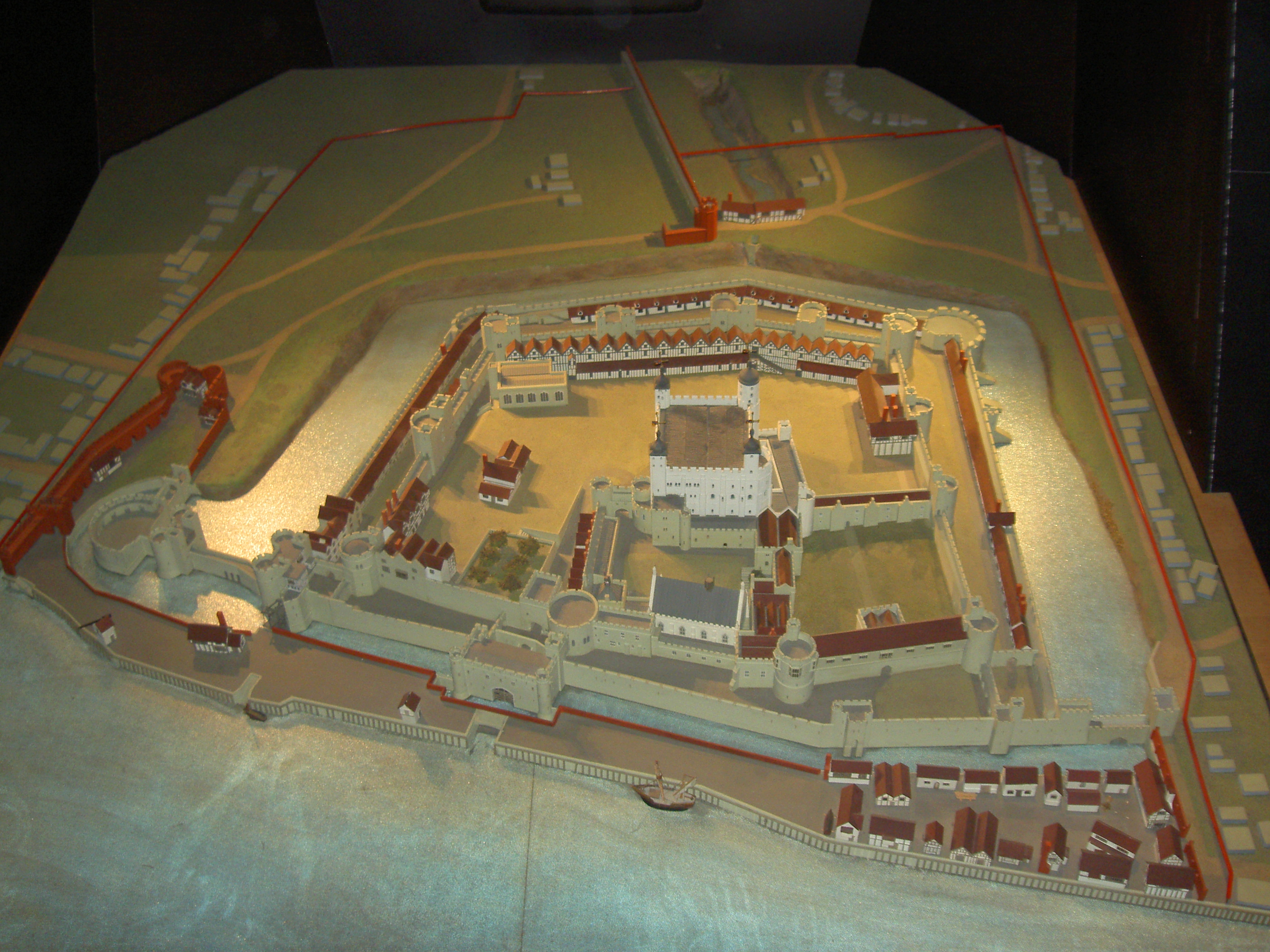
Scale model of the Tower of London showing the Bulwark Gate and bastion to the left

No. 7 of the original 31 Tower Liberty boundary markers is sited at the bottom of the steps linking Gloucester Court to Tower Hill Terrace and no. 8 is positioned at the base of the circular concrete air duct adjoining Tower Hill.

== Bulwark Gate (site of) ==
Immediately east of the Tower of London Welcome Centre on Great Tower Hill are the buried structural remains of the medieval Bulwark Gate and bastion. The lower half of Tower Hill was enclosed in the late 15th century to protect the western entrance to the Tower of London. The large brick bastion commissioned by Edward IV extended part way up Tower Hill from Tower Dock, but was demolished in 1668.

== Tower Subway ==
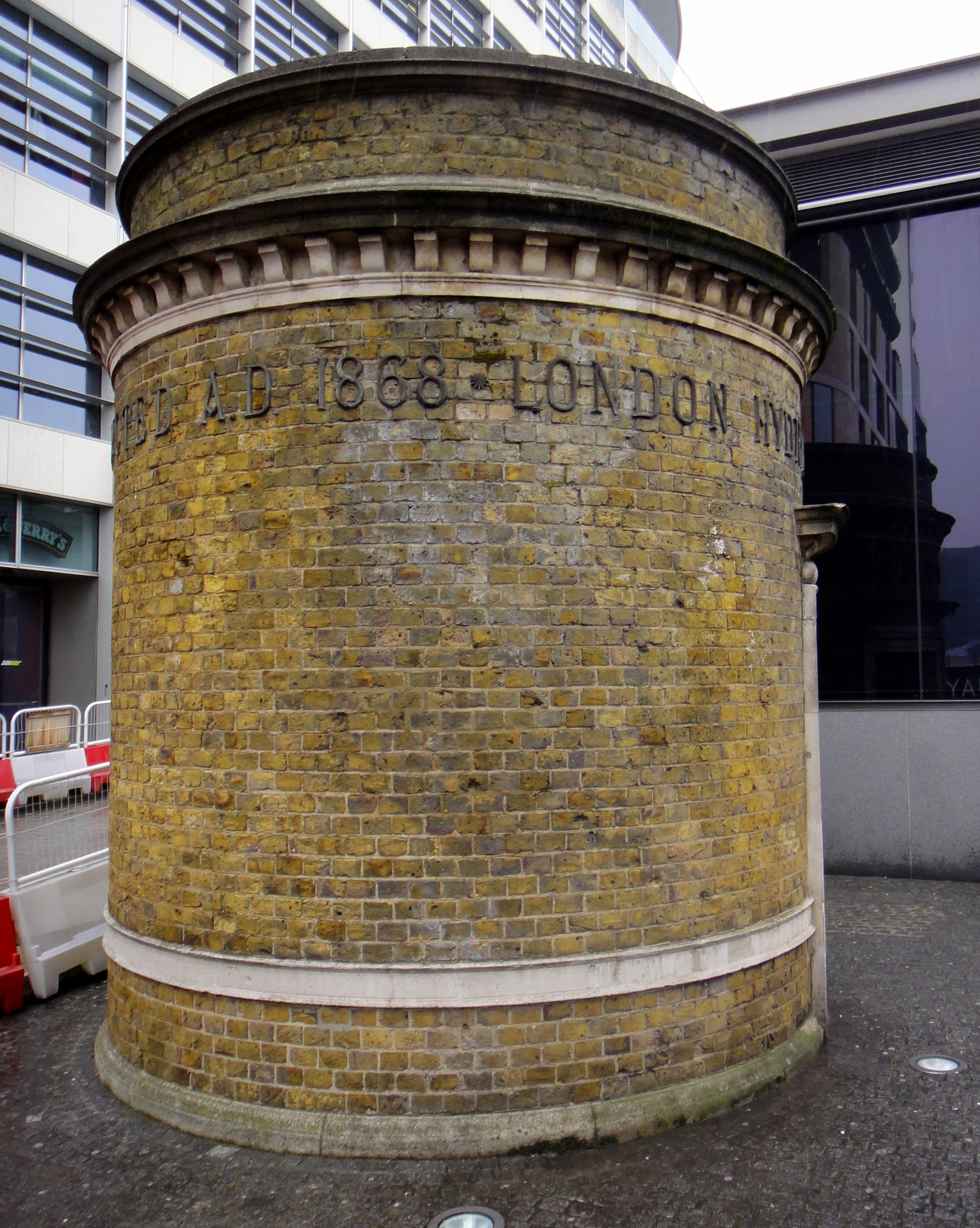
Tower Subway entrance, March 2013

Tower Subway is a tunnel under the Thames running from Tower Hill to Vine Lane in Southwark. The round brick-built entrance building near the Tower of London's ticket office was constructed in 1926 by the London Hydraulic Power Company. The year of 1868 visible on the structure refers to the Tower Subway Act 1868 which authorised the construction of the tunnel.

== Former Pump House ==
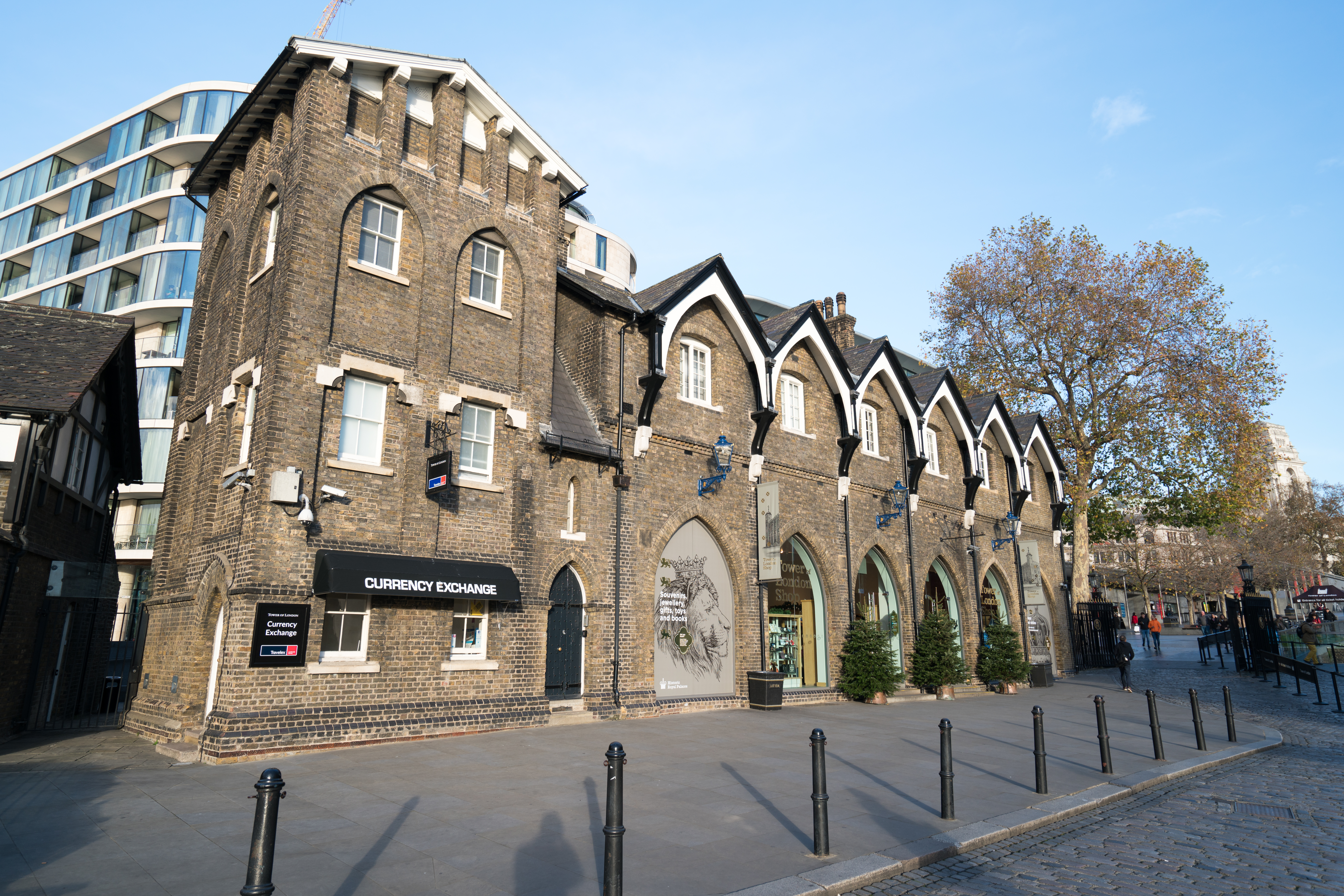
The Tower of London shop at the former pump house, November 2017

The Grade II-listed former pump house (Tower of London shop) was built in 1863 and designed by the architect Anthony Salvin.

== Public transport ==
London Buses route 15 east to Blackwall and west to Trafalgar Square runs along Tower Hill. Tower Hill tube station is adjacent and Tower Gateway DLR station close by, as is Tower Pier for London River Services.
