= Richard Payne (priest) =

English priest (died 1507)

Richard Payne BDec (died 1507) was a Canon of Windsor, England, from 1499 to 1507.

== Career ==
He was appointed:

- Prebendary of Minor Pars Altaris in Salisbury 1490
- Queen's Almoner
- Master of St Katherine's Hospital by the Tower 1499
- Rector of Debden, Essex

He was appointed to the fifth stall in St George's Chapel, Windsor Castle in 1499 and held the canonry until 1507.
