= Royal Foundation of St Katharine =

Medieval church and hospital in London

Coordinates: 51°30′23.09″N 0°4′21.87″W

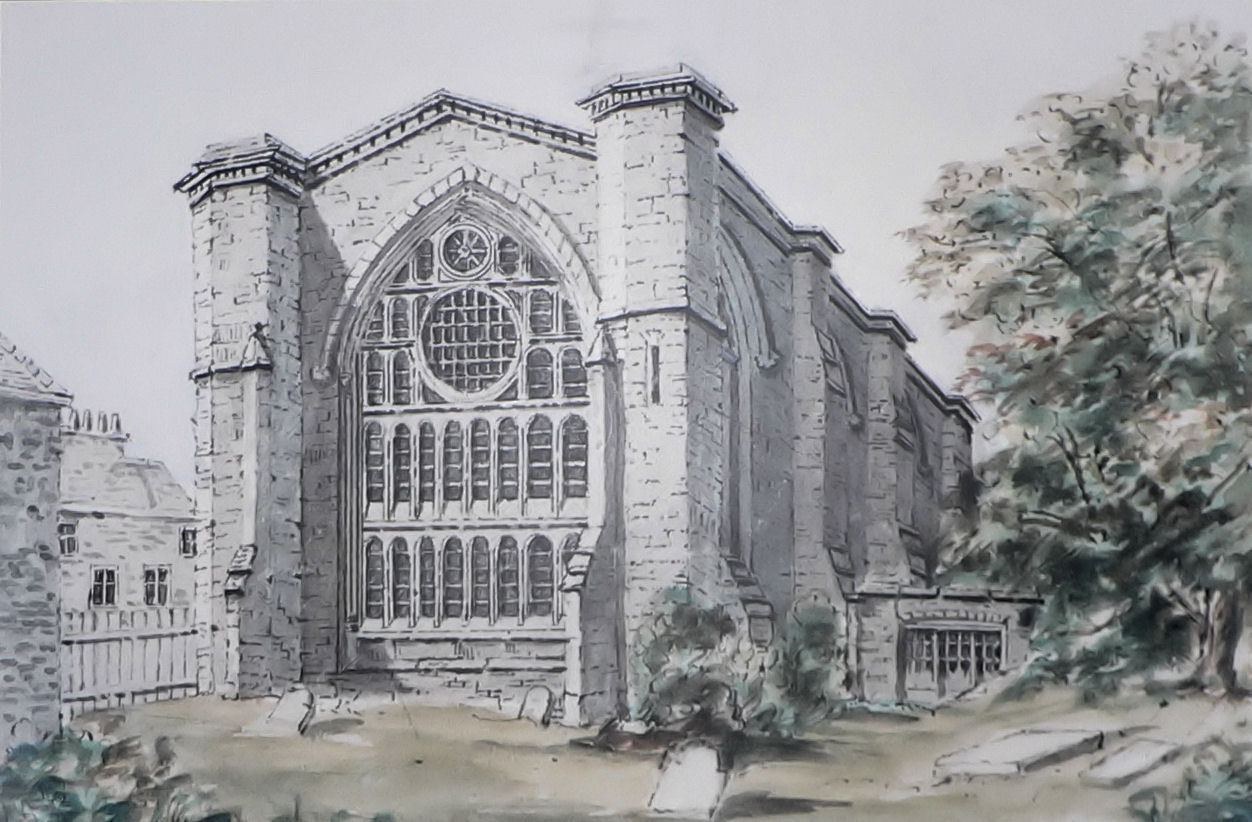
East end of St Katharine's Church, the chapel of the hospice before its removal in the 19th century

The Royal Foundation of St Katharine is a religious charity based in the East End of London. The Foundation traces its origins back to the medieval church and monastic hospital St Katharine's by the Tower (full name Royal Hospital and Collegiate Church of St. Katharine by the Tower), established in 1147, next to the Tower of London.

The church, a royal peculiar, was the heart of the Precinct of St Katharine by the Tower, a small but densely populated district; a Liberty with extra-parochial status, and which later became a civil parish. Both the church and the district were destroyed in 1825 to make way for the new St Katharine Docks which took its name from the church and district it replaced.

The institution itself survived the destruction associated with the construction of the dock, by transferring to a site near Regents Park, but it returned to the East End after World War II, using the site of Ratcliff's parish church, St James, which had been destroyed by bombing during the Blitz.

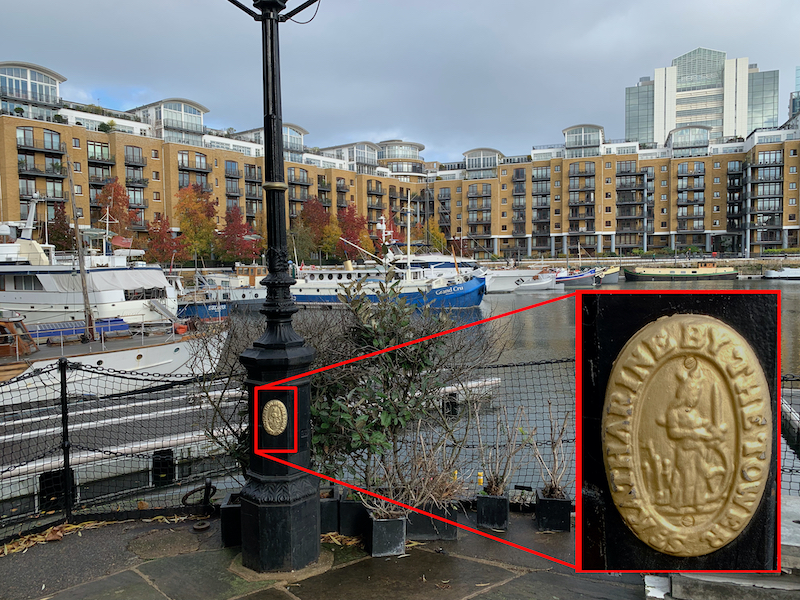
St Katharine by the Tower decoration on lamppost

== Original church ==
It was strongly associated with queens, from its foundation by Matilda of Boulogne in 1147 in memory of two of her children, Baldwin and Matilda, who had died in infancy and been buried in the Priory Church of Holy Trinity at Aldgate. Its endowment was increased by two subsequent queens consort, Eleanor of Castile (who gave a gift of manors) and Philippa of Hainault. It was made up of three brothers, three sisters (with full and equal rights), a beadswoman and six "poor clerks", all under a master. It was a religious community and medieval hospital for poor infirm people next to the Tower of London. In 1273, after a dispute over its control, Eleanor of Provence granted a new charter, reserving the foundation's patronage to the queens of England. For 678 years, the foundation carried on its work in the East End of London despite periodic difficulties and renewal. In the 15th century its musical reputation rivalled that of St Paul's Cathedral and in 1442 it was granted a charter of privileges which made it and its 23-acre (93,000 m^{2}) precinct a liberty with its own prison, officers and court, all outside the City of London's ecclesiastical and civil jurisdiction.

Its liberty status and the fact it was personally owned and protected by the queen meant that it was not dissolved but re-established in a Protestant form. It continued to exist through the religious changes of the time: reversion to Roman Catholicism under Mary I, return to Anglicanism under Elizabeth I and the Puritan Revolution. Its continuing establishment of lay brothers and sisters, however, drew hostile attention from extreme Protestants—for example, it was only saved from being burned down by the mob in the 1780 Gordon Riots by a small group of pro-government inhabitants.

== Precinct ==
From 1236, the area had a Jewish population, settled in the area for the protection of the Tower and its garrison. The Jews had to take refuge in the Tower several times and on at least one of those occasions, in 1267, during the Second Barons' War, formed part of its defensive garrison during a siege. This arrangement lasted until the expulsion of the Jews from England in 1290.

In 1442, the neighbourhood "was constituted a Precinct free from jurisdiction civil or ecclesiastical, except that of the Lord Chancellor". With the dissolution of the monasteries by King Henry VIII in 1531, the land became the property of the Crown, and many of the religious houses were given to prominent nobles. The hospital of St Katharine was not seized, but re-established as a Protestant house — with houses and a brewery being built within the precincts.

By Henry VIII's time, there were 1,000 houses (including a brewery – the Red Lion Brewery) in the precinct, with many foreigners, vagabonds and prostitutes, crammed along narrow lanes (with names like Dark Entry, Cat's Hole, Shovel Alley, Rookery and Pillory Lane) and many houses in poor repair – John Stow's 1598 "Survey of London" called them "small tenements and homely cottages, having as inhabitants, English and strangers [i.e. foreigners], more in number than some city in England". Since the City's guilds' restrictions did not apply here, foreign craftsmen were attracted to the liberty, as were many seamen and rivermen.

Foreign ships were not permitted to use the wharfs within the City, and St Katharine's Quay came to be used extensively for unloading these, particularly Dutch ships. Many French settled here, after the loss of Calais. A large number were from the districts of Hammes and Guisnes, leading to a part of the Precinct becoming known as Hangman's Gains.

At the time of the Spanish Armada, Queen Elizabeth I wanted to understand the number and origin of foreigners in London. At that time the little precinct included 425 foreigners many of them shoemakers, with many of the English subjects working as seamen. The foreigners included 328 Dutch, 69 French (mostly hatmakers), 12 Scots, 8 Danes, 5 Poles, 2 Spaniards and 1 Italian. It's not clear if the exiles from Calais were counted among the French or whether they were considered as English subjects.

With trade in the City regulated by the City, St Katharine became an area for foreign settlement. At the end of the 19th century, the quay was the terminus for passenger boats arriving from northern Europe, and became the arrival point for Ashkenazi Jews fleeing persecution in eastern Europe. Many settled around Whitechapel and Spitalfields, only a half–mile to the north.

The status of St Katharine's appears to be ambiguous with the court leet behaving more like a select vestry. The area was successfully incorporated into the weekly bills of mortality returns, which was not typical for extra-parochial places in London.

Despite the high population density, however, in the Great Plague the liberty's mortality rate was half of the rate in areas to the north and east of the City of London.

The diverse nature of the area's population can be seen through the sectarian Gordon Riots in 1780. The ringleaders of the protestant mob that sought to destroy the church was led by a lame soldier named MacDonald, and two women, one black and one white. All three were hanged, on Tower Hill, for their role in the disturbances.

The area of St Katharine's by the Tower was grouped into the Whitechapel District in 1855 and became a civil parish in 1866 when its extra-parochial status ended, following the Poor Law Amendment Act 1866. The parish became part of the County of London in 1889. In 1895 it was abolished as a parish and combined with St Botolph without Aldgate.

Decennial census data from the Precinct illustrates the once densely populated nature of the area, and the steep fall in population associated with the creation of the docks.

Year	1801	1811	1821	1831	1841	1851	1871	1881	1891
Population	2,652	2,706	2,624	72	96	517	241	104	182

== St Katharine Docks ==
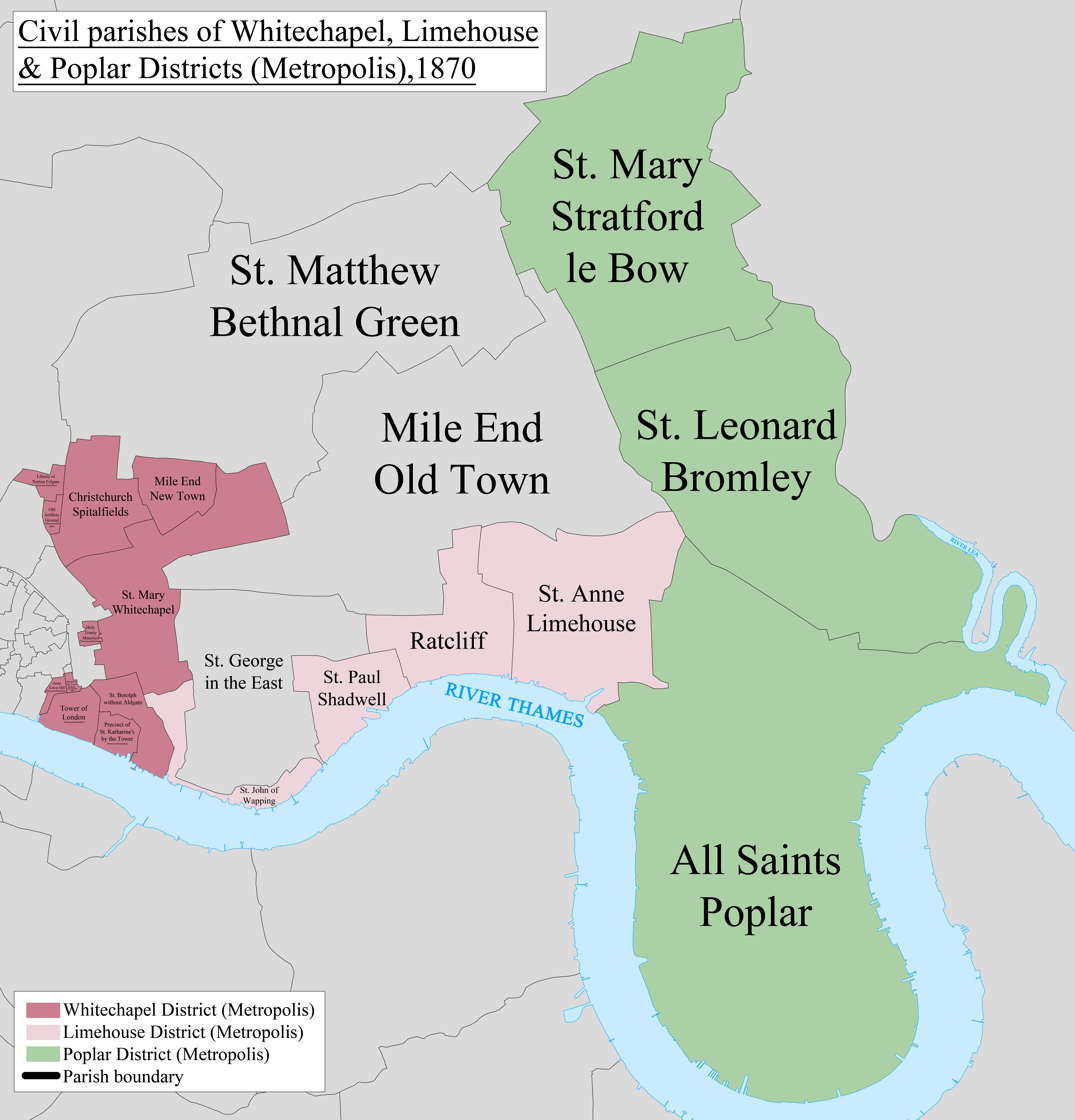
Map showing East End civil parish boundaries in 1870. St Katherine's Precinct is to the left by the river in the purple shaded section. The foundation returned to the East End after World War II, now in the area near center of the map, called Ratcliff (pink)

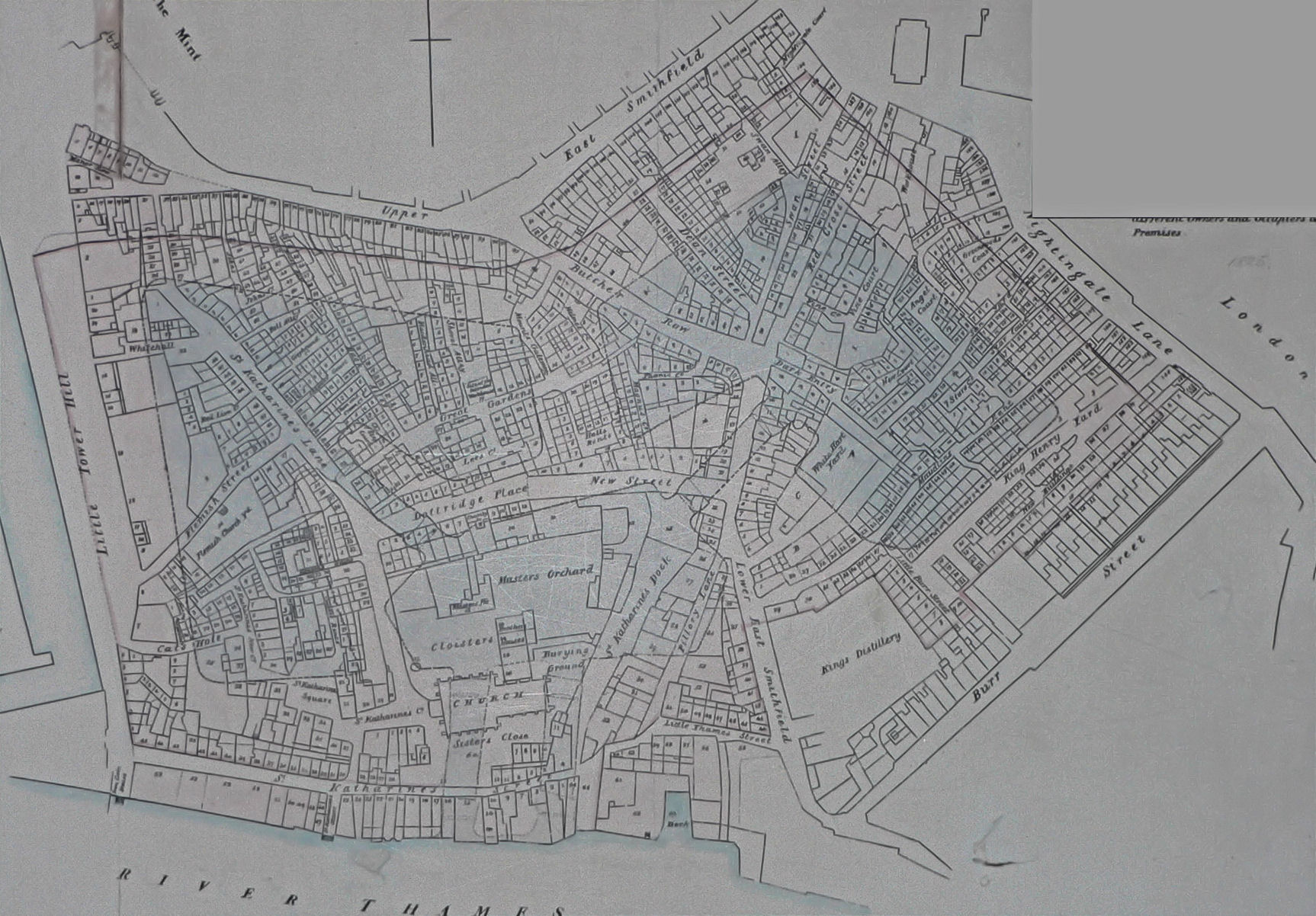
Maps showing the St Katharine's district, and parts of East Smithfield that would be destroyed by the new dock complex

Georgian London, by then one of the world's largest cities, had seen several docks built to handle its huge shipping industry. There was commercial pressure for another dock, further upriver near the Pool of London, close to the heart of the City, and St Katharine's was chosen as the location in 1825. Some opposed the demolition of such an ancient establishment but in large part (in the words of Sir James Broodbank in his History of the Port of London) the dock construction was praised for demolishing "some of the most insanitary and unsalutary dwellings in London". The old buildings of St Katharine's Liberty were demolished and its inhabitants scattered, to create St Katharine Docks.

== After the docks ==
=== Regents Park ===
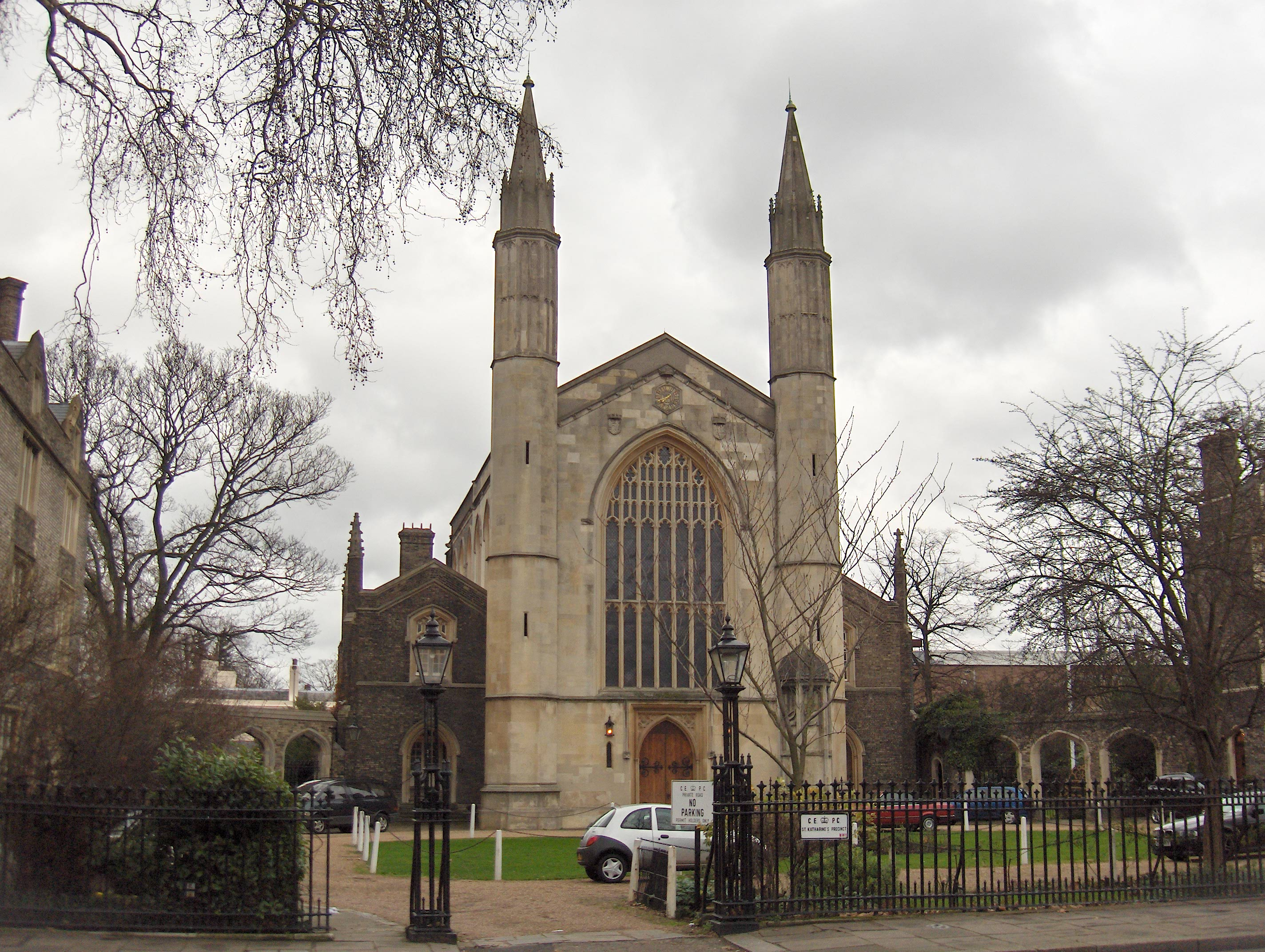
St Katharine's Church, Regent's Park (now the Danish Church)

The institution, now called the Royal Foundation of St Katharine, moved to a site near Regent's Park, where it took the form of almshouses and continued for 125 years. St Katharine's Church was built there from 1826 to 1828, with Ambrose Poynter as its architect.

The former chapel of St Katharine at Regent's Park is now the Danish Church.

=== Return to the East End ===
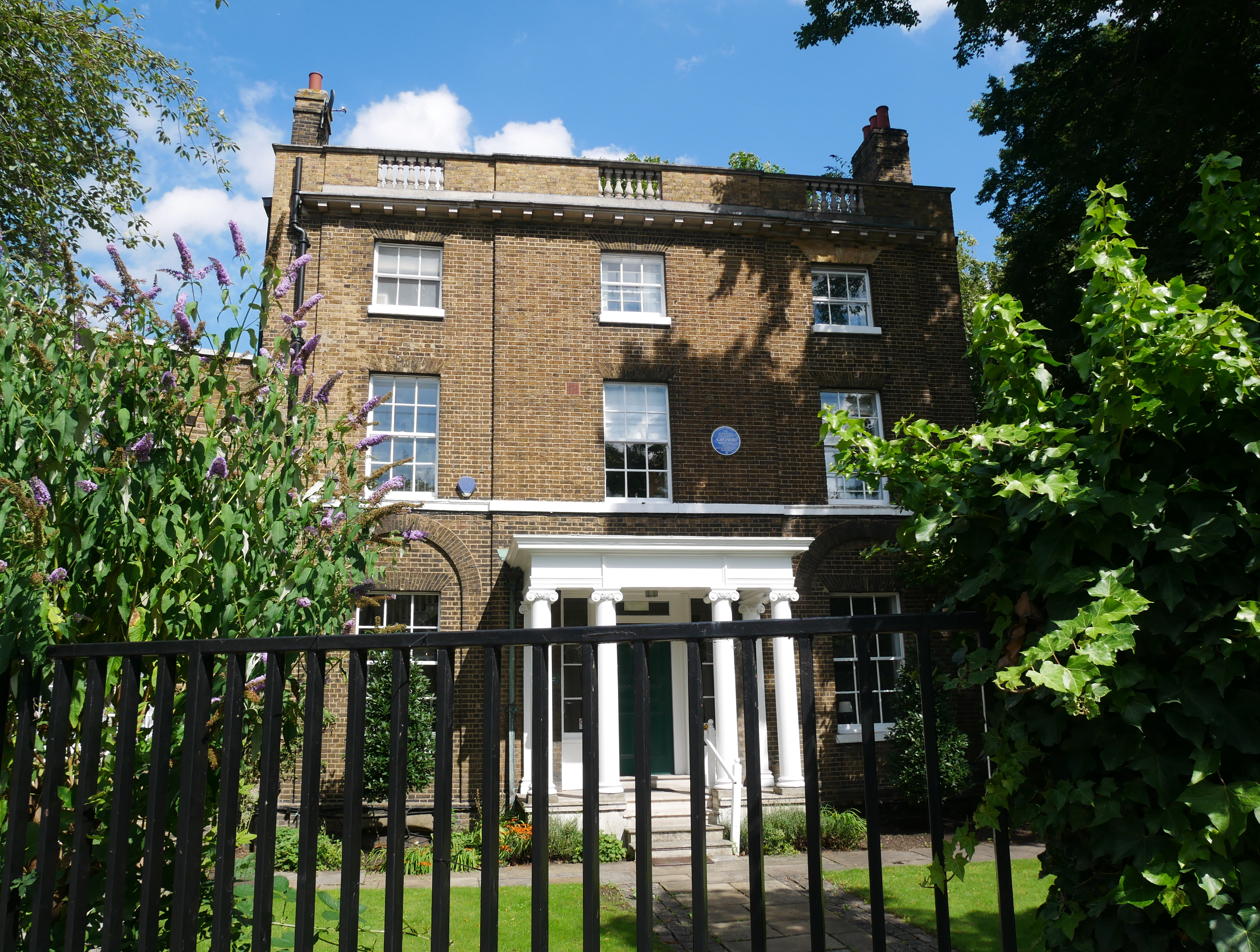
The current home of the Royal Foundation of Saint Katharine, Butcher Row, Ratcliff

In 1948, St Katharine's returned to East London after a gap of 123 years. It now uses the site of the former St James Church, the parish church of Ratcliff which had been destroyed in the Blitz. The present location, which is a mile from its original site, became a retreat house with Father John Groser as master and members of the Community of the Resurrection from Mirfield providing worship and service. The foundation remained under the care of this community for some 45 years until 1993. In 2004, St Katharine’s modernised and expanded its facilities to include a retreat and conference centre, so making available its hospitality more widely within the Church of England and to other churches, charities, voluntary and public sector bodies and to associated individuals.

== Masters of the college ==
Masters have been:

- Gilbert (1257)
- Walter de Runachmore (1263)
- Thomas de Chalke (1266)
- Stephen de Fulborne (1269)
- Thomas de Lechlake (1273)
- Symon de Stanbridge (1288)
- Walter de Reading (1295)
- John de Sandale (1315)
- Richard de Lutishall (1316)
- Robert de Bast (or Basse) (1327)
- William de Culshoe (1336)
- William de Erldesby (1340)
- Walter Watewany (1347)
- William de Hogate (1348)
- Paulet (1349)
- Paul de Monte-Florio (1351)
- John de Hermesthorp (1368)
- William de Kildesbey (or Killesby) (1377)
- Richard Prentys (1402)
- William Wrixham (1412)
- John Francke (1438)
- Thomas de Beckington (1444)
- John Delabere (1446)
- William Cleve (1449)
- Henry Trevilian (1461)
- Lionel Woodville (1475)
- William Wernham (1484)
- Richard Payne (1499)
- John Preston (1508)
- George de Athequa (1527)
- Gilbert Latham (1536)
- Thomas Seymour, 1st Baron Seymour of Sudeley (1547)
- Sir Francis Fleming (1549)
- Francis Mallet (1554)
- Thomas Wylson (1561)
- David Lewis (1581)
- Ralph Rokeby (1587)
- Julius Caesar (1596)
- Sir Robert Acton (1636)
- Dr. Coxe (1653)
- Henry Montague (1659)
- George Montague (1661)
- William Brouncker, 2nd Viscount Brouncker (1681)
- Sir James Butler (1684)
- Louis de Duras, 2nd Earl of Feversham (1698)
- Sir Henry Newton (1709)
- William Farrer (1715)
- George Berkeley (1738)
- Edmund Waller Jr. (1747)
- Stephen Digby (1786)
- Maj. William Price (1800)
- Col. Edward Disbrowe (1816)
- Maj-Gen. Sir Herbert Taylor (1818)
- William Ashley (1839)
- Rev. J.H.S. St. John Blunt (1879)
- Rev. Arthur L.B. Peile (1889)
- Rev. Severne Majendie (1914)
- Rev. St. John B. Groser (1948)
- Rev. Henry Cooper (1963)
- Rev. Augustine Hoey (1968)
- Rev. Jack Guinness (1972)
- Rev. George Sidebotham (1975)
- Rev. Christopher Lowe (1982)
- Rev. Malcolm Johnson (1993)
- Rev. Prebendary Ronald Swan (1997)
- Rev. Prebendary David Paton (2006)
- Rev. Mark Aitken (2013)
- The Venerable Roger Preece (2019)

== Burials ==
- John Holland, 2nd Duke of Exeter
- VADM William Rainsborough, MP and English ambassador to Morocco
- Anne Stafford, Countess of March, (d. 20 September 1432)
- Thomas Walsingham died in 1457 and he and his wife, Margaret, were buried in the church of St Katherine’s by the Tower.

== Cultural references ==
The establishment forms the setting for Sir Walter Besant's novel St Katherine's by the Tower, set in the years following the French Revolution. He also deplored its demolition in his non-fiction book East London.
