= Old Artillery Ground =

Coordinates: 51°31′7″N 0°4′38″W

- Civil parish
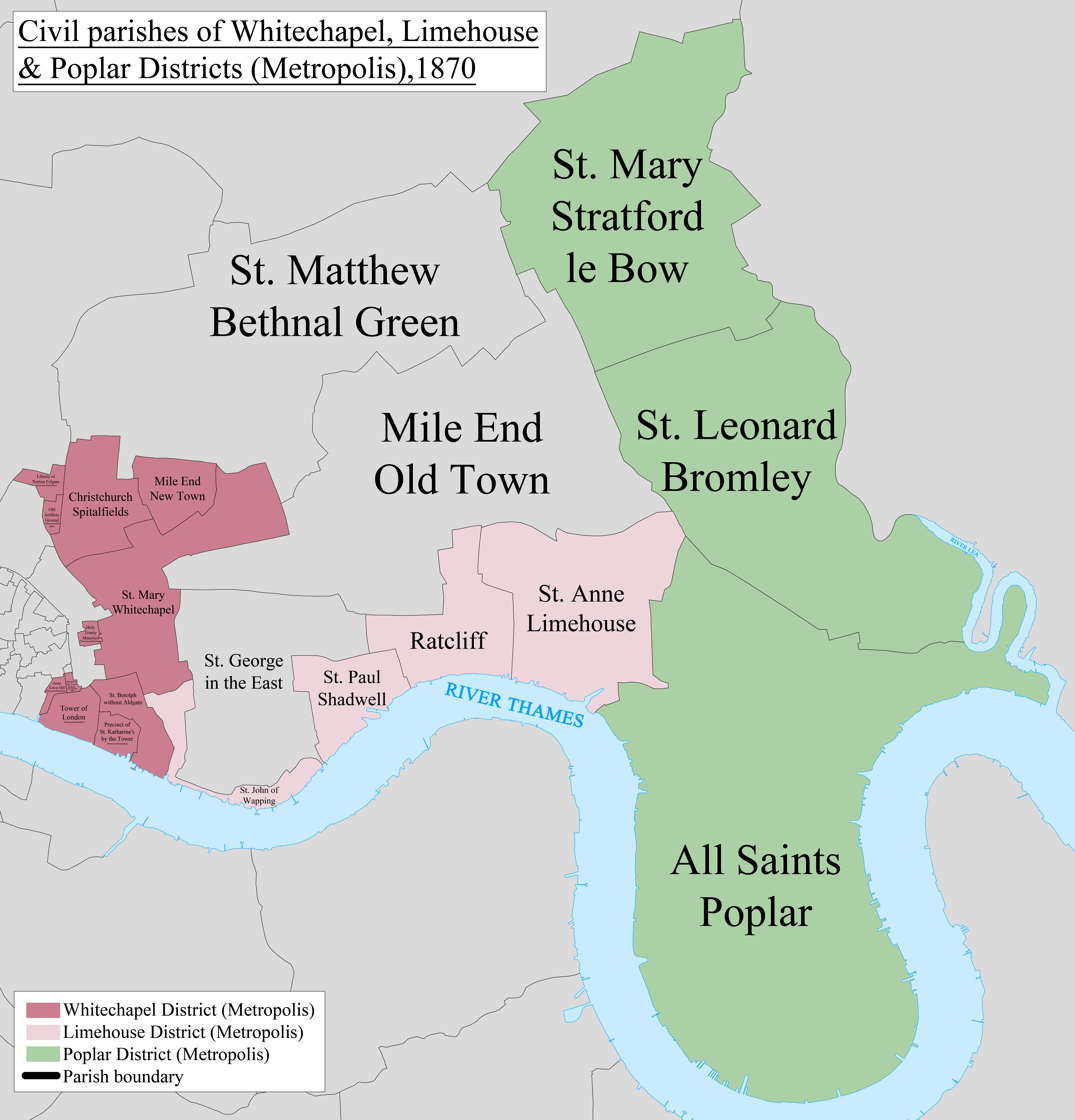
- Area
  - 1911: 5 acres (0.020 km^{2})
- Population
  - 1911: 1472
- History
  - Abolished: 1 April 1921
  - Succeeded by: Whitechapel

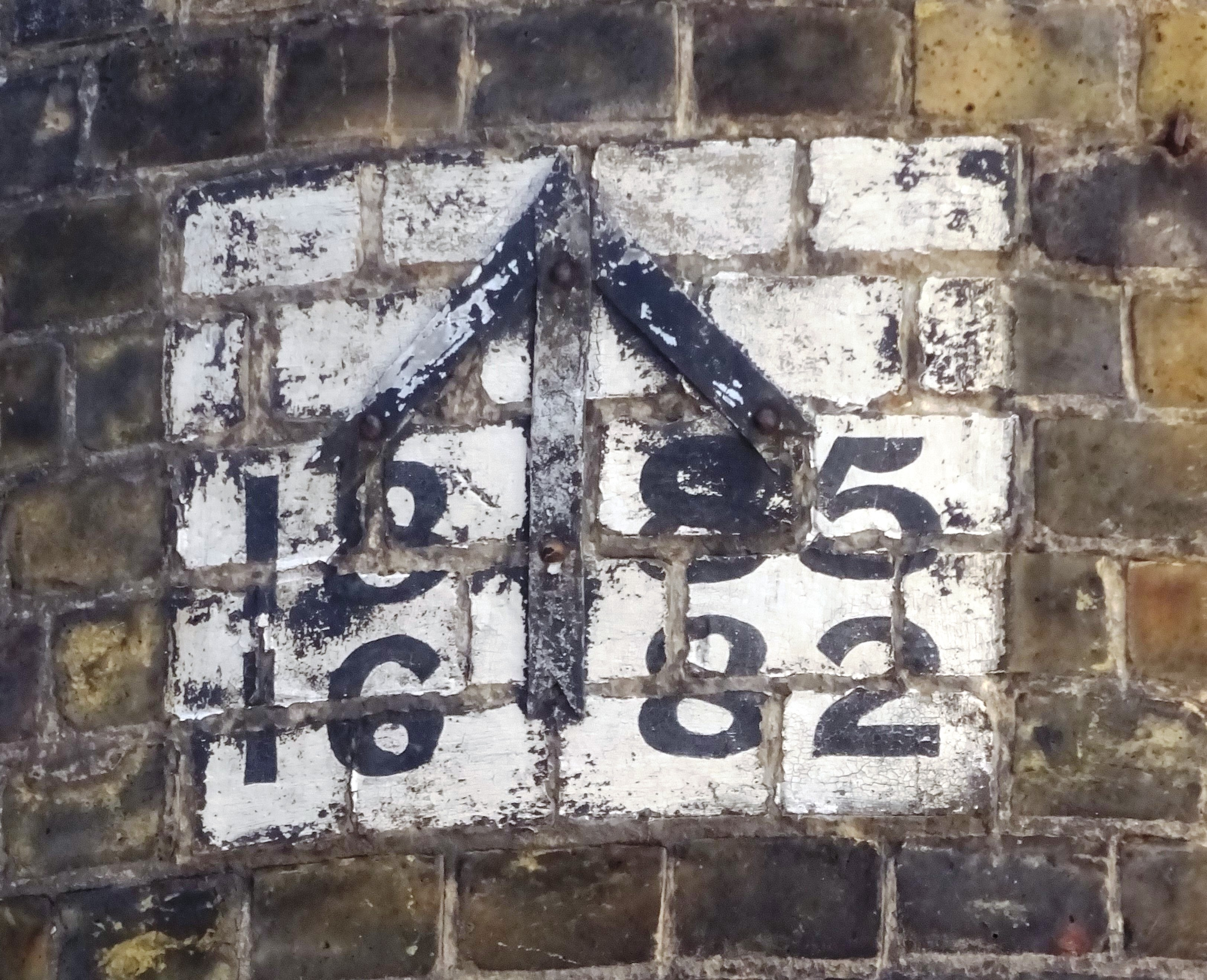
Metal broad arrow at 9 Artillery Passage, erected in 1682 to mark the boundary of the Old Artillery Ground

The Old Artillery Ground is an area of land in Spitalfields, London formerly designated one of the Liberties of the Tower of London and Crown Land.

Originally the outer precinct of the Priory and Hospital of St Mary Spital, it was converted to an Artillery Ground in 1538, under Henry VIII, for the use of 'The Fraternity or Guild of Artillery of Longbows, Crossbows and Handguns', also known as 'The Fraternity of St George'. This group were later known as the Honourable Artillery Company and used the ground in conjunction with the Gunners of the Tower.

In 1658 the Honourable Artillery Company moved to a new Artillery Ground in Bunhill Fields, leaving the Gunners of the Tower in possession of the area until 1682, when it was sold off to speculative builders. These latter developed the area for housing, designating the streets with their present names of Fort Street, Gun Street, Artillery Passage and Artillery Lane which recall its former use.

In 1900 it and the neighbouring Liberty of Norton Folgate became part of the new Metropolitan Borough of Stepney. On 1 April 1921 the civil parish was abolished and merged with Whitechapel. At the 1911 census (one of the last before the abolition of the parish), Old Artillery Ground had a population of 1472. Since 1965 the area has been administered by the London Borough of Tower Hamlets.

== See also ==
- Stepney Historical Trust
