= Liberties Act 1850 =

Act of the Parliament of the United Kingdom

Liberties Act 1850 (Note: The citation of this act by this short title was authorised by section 1 of, and the first schedule to, the Short Titles Act 1896. Due to the repeal of those provisions it is now authorised by section 19(2) of the Interpretation Act 1978.)
- Act of Parliament
- Parliament of the United Kingdom
- Long title: An Act for facilitating the Union of Liberties with the Counties in which they are situate.
- Citation: 13 & 14 Vict. c. 105
- Territorial extent: England and Wales (Note: Section 11.)

Dates
- Royal assent: 14 August 1850
- Commencement: 14 August 1850 (Note: The Acts of Parliament (Commencement) Act 1793.)
- Repealed: 5 September 1974
Other legislation
Amended by	Statute Law Revision Act 1875; Statute Law Revision Act 1891; Justices of the Peace Act 1949; [[Statute Law Revision Act 1966]]
Repealed by	Local Authorities etc. (Miscellaneous Provision) (No. 4) Order 1974
Relates to	Municipal Corporations Act 1835

Status: Repealed

Text of statute as originally enacted

The Liberties Act 1850 (13 & 14 Vict. c. 105) was an act of the Parliament of the United Kingdom that provided a mechanism to enable the various liberties or independent jurisdictions in England and Wales to be merged into the geographical counties in which they lay.

== Background ==
Throughout England and Wales there were numerous liberties which were for historic reasons, to varying degrees, independent of the administration of the authorities of the county in which they lay. By the nineteenth century it had become clear that their continued existence was causing inefficiencies in local government and frustrating the effective administration of justice. Liberties generally had a commission of the peace and gaol distinct from those of the county, and the Inspectors of Prisons, in their annual report of 1850 noted:

The inconvenience of these separate jurisdictions is most obvious, and particularly where they extend into more counties than one, which is not unfrequently the case. The prisons retained in them for the confinement of prisoners under criminal and civil process are of the most inferior description, and in civil cases the prison of a Liberty is not unfrequently selected either by the debtor or the creditor; by the former, as leaving him under less restraint than the county gaol; by the latter, as likely to punish respectability by its uncleanliness and discomfort.

== The act ==
The act applied to any liberty that possessed a separate commission of the peace, be they divisions of a county, counties of a town or city or sokes.

The justices of the peace of any liberty, or of any county in which a liberty lay, were given the right to prepare a petition seeking the union of the liberty with the county. Notice of the resolution to prepare the petition was to be published for three successive weeks in both a London newspaper and one circulating in the county involved. The petition was to lay out the reasons for the proposed union, and to set out in detail the arrangements for taking over the property of the liberty, and the payments to be made, or continued employment by the county of those holding franchise or office in the liberty.

If the petition was approved by the Privy Council, a notice to that effect was to be published in the London Gazette. The notice would detail the areas involved, and the parishes formerly in the liberty would be annexed to existing hundreds and petty sessional divisions of the county.

Following the union:

- The inhabitants of the liberty were to become liable for jury service in the county
- The gaol of the liberty was to become a county institution
- Prisoners were to be sent for trial at the county quarter sessions or assizes
- The records of the liberty were to be delivered to the custos rotulorum of the county
- The treasurer of the liberty was to pay over all monies to the county treasurer

Where municipal boroughs incorporated under the Municipal Corporations Act 1835 (5 & 6 Will. 4. c. 76) had been granted a separate court of quarter sessions, they were expressly exempt from the legislation.

== Unions effected under the act ==
Notices of the following unions of liberties with counties were published in the London Gazette:

- 21 March 1864: The Liberty of Cawood, Wistow and Otley united with the West Riding of Yorkshire.
- 1 July 1892: The Liberty of Havering atte Bower united with the County of Essex.
- 25 June 1894: The Liberties of the Tower of London united with the County of London.
