= Tower Dock =

Dock west of the Tower of London

Coordinates: 51.508°N 0.079°W

Tower Dock is an inlet of the Thames immediately west of the Tower of London. Only the mouth of the dock remains with the rest having been filled in during the late 1950s.

== Location ==
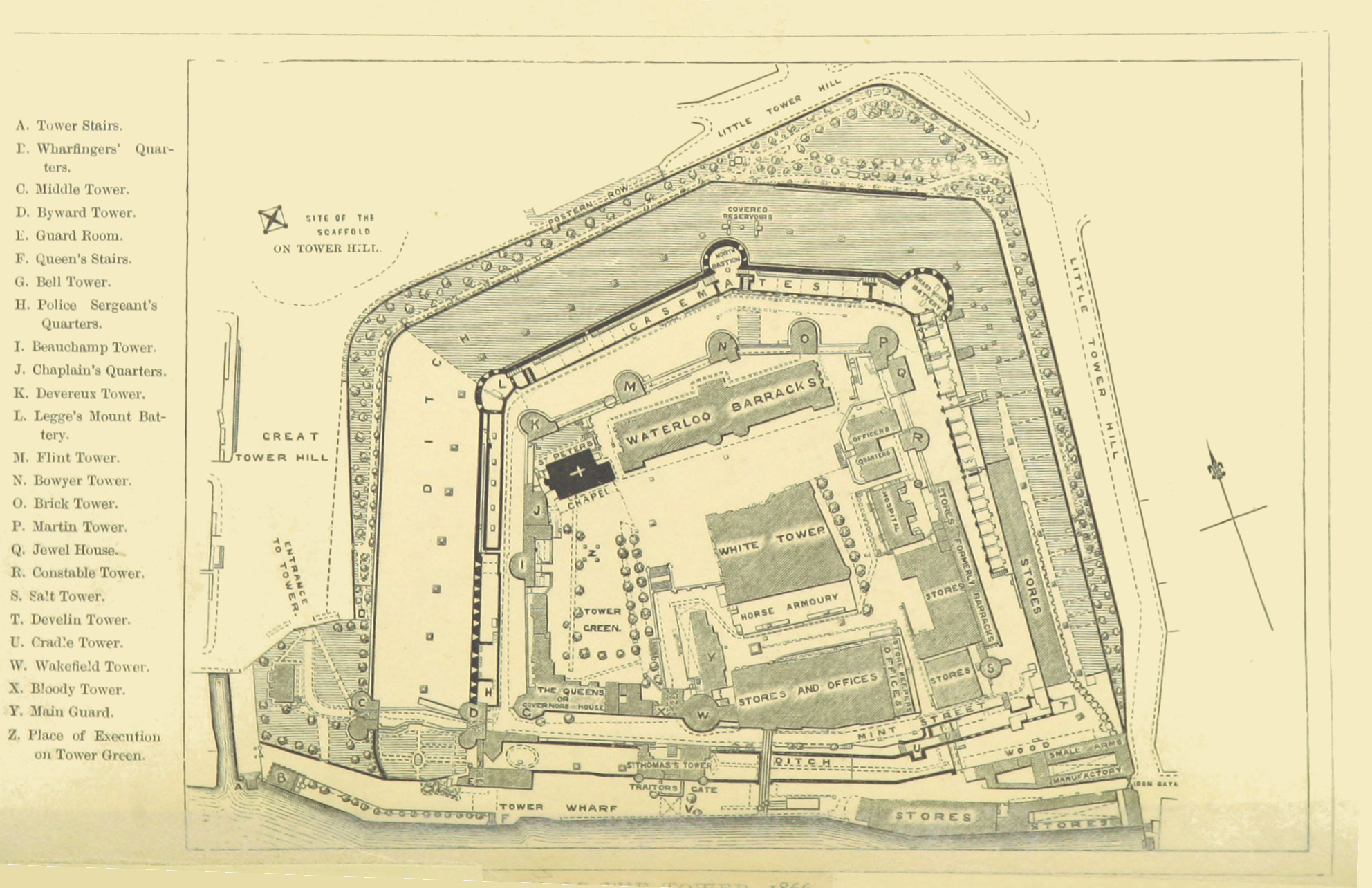
The Tower Dock shown to the south-west of the Tower of London, 1866

Tower Dock lay immediately west of the Tower of London's entrance complex, and contributed to the defensibility of that complex.

The dock formed part of the boundary of the Tower Liberty, an area managed by the Tower of London, in part to ensure that there was a clear undeveloped area around the fortress, as the presence of buildings would have given cover to attackers. These boundaries of the Liberty have been inherited by the London Borough of Tower Hamlets, as part of its boundary with the City of London.

== Origin and demise ==
The origin of the dock is obscure but may represent a section of the natural shoreline left behind when the wharves on either side were built. The first stage of Tower Wharf, to the east, was extended out into the river around 1276–1324.

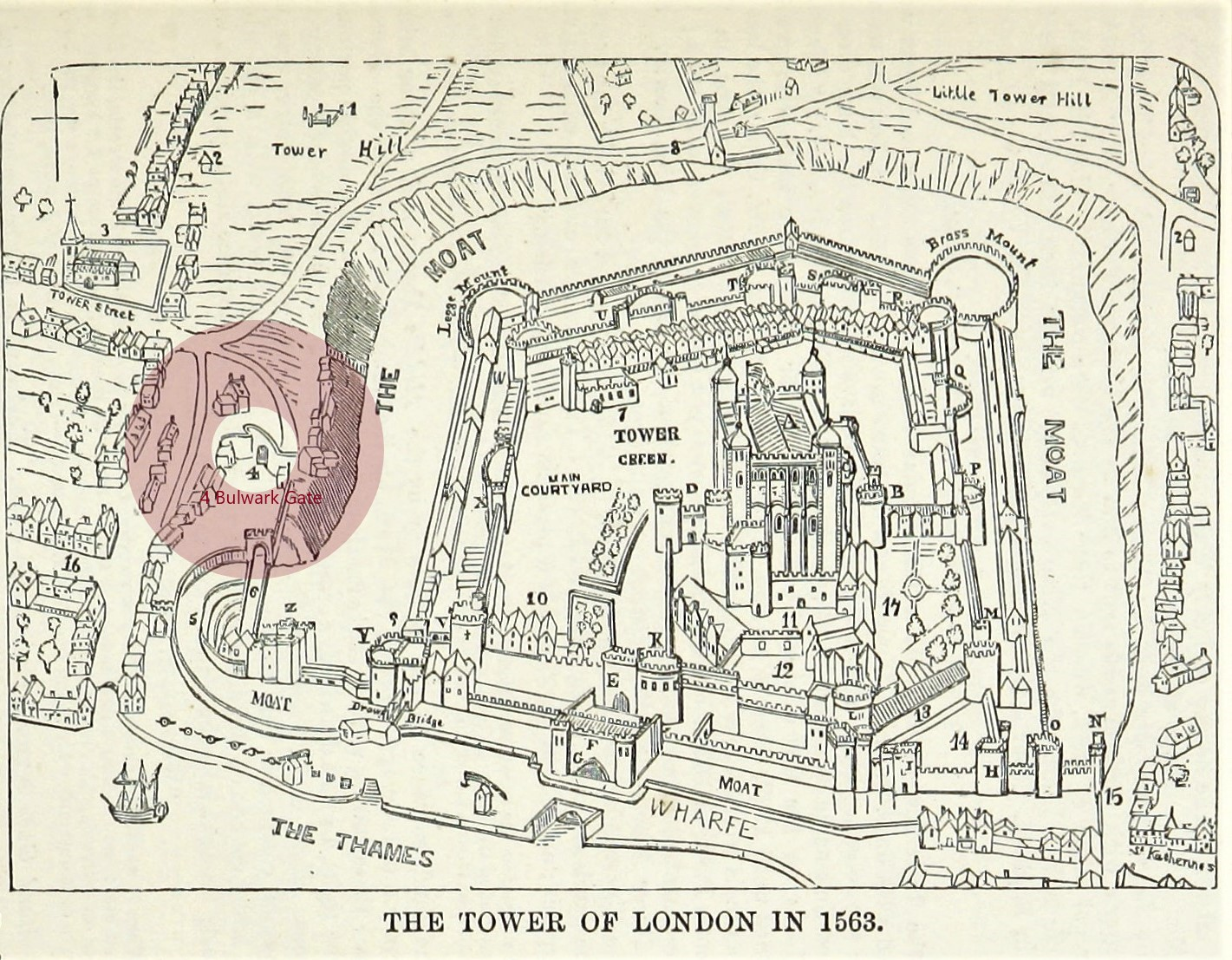
Tower Dock may once have extended around the Bulwark fortification (circled)

The dock appears to have once been much more extensive. A report written in 1623 described the dock as the remaining part of a moat around a now lost feature called the Bulwark, built around 1480, which was the outermost part of the Tower's western gateway complex. It is not known whether it was a wet or dry moat but it presumably connected to the main moat. At the time of the report the Bulwark still stood, but its moat, save for the surviving part of Tower Dock, had been filled in.

In 1706 more of the dock "between Thames Street and Tower Hill" was filled in with rubbish from the locality.

In the late 1950s, all but the mouth of the dock, was filled in and paved, during the construction of the now demolished and replaced Three Quays House.

== Events ==
In 1617 Walter Raleigh led an unsuccessful attempt to plunder Spain's colonial empire in the Americas and also find the mythical city of gold, El Dorado. The expedition was a failure and the King of Spain applied enormous diplomatic pressure for Raleigh's arrest and execution.

Expecting him to be seized at any moment, Raleigh's wife arranged an escape plan. Raleigh donned a disguise and made his way to Tower Dock where a boatman awaited him. The boat slipped out into the Thames, intending to take Raleigh downstream to Tilbury where a ship awaited.

But Raleigh had been betrayed by someone he trusted; a second boat awaited him in the river. He was arrested and imprisoned in the Tower.
