= Tubby Clayton =

Founder of Toc H

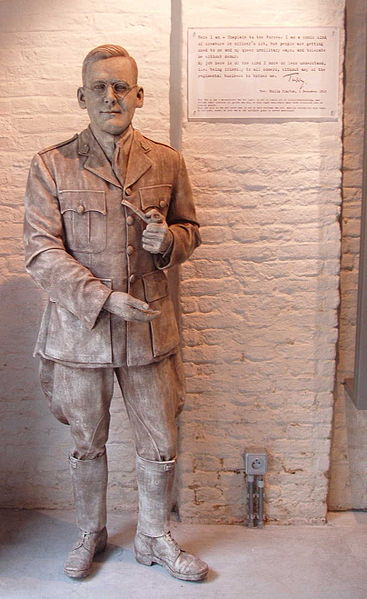
Philip "Tubby" Clayton in "Talbot House", Poperinge, Belgium

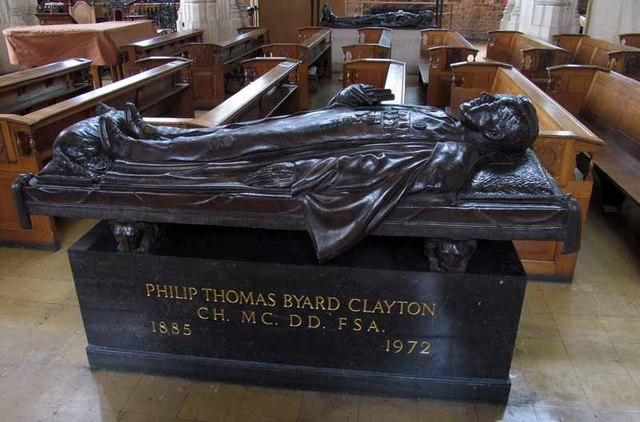
Effigy of Tubby Clayton in All Hallows-by-the-Tower

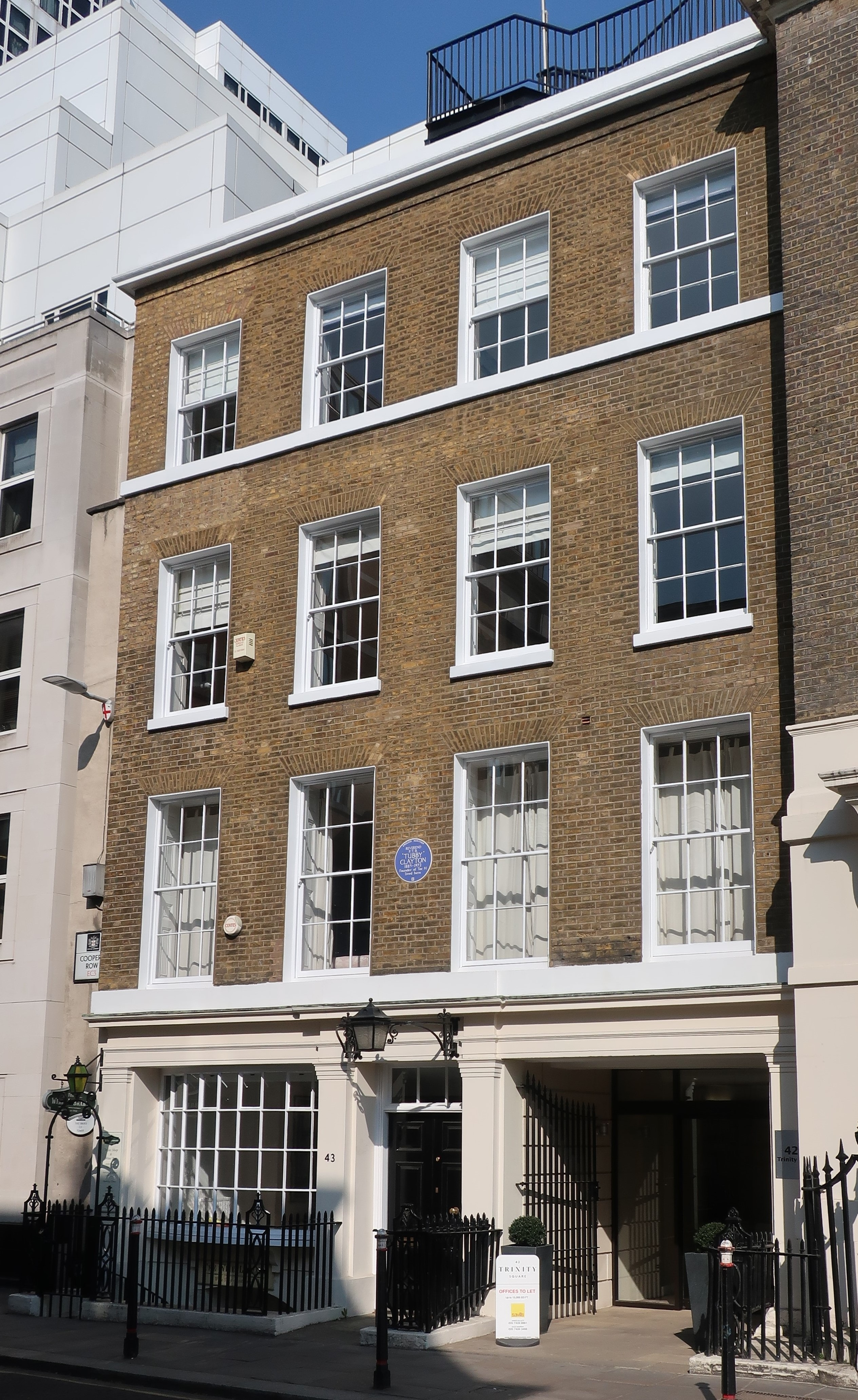
The former vicarage of All-Hallows-by-the-Tower, marked with an English Heritage blue plaque to Clayton

Philip Thomas Byard Clayton CH MC FSA (12 December 1885 – 16 December 1972), known as "Tubby" Clayton, was an Anglican clergyman and the founder of Toc H.

== Life and career ==
Philip Clayton was born in Maryborough, Queensland, Australia, to English parents who brought him back to England when he was two years old. His father, sugar plantation manager Reginald Byard Buchanan Clayton (1845–1927) and his mother Isabel Byard Sheppard (1848–1919) were first cousins, through both of whom he descended from George Sheppard, a clothier in Frome. He was educated at St Paul's School in London and at Exeter College, Oxford, where he obtained a First in Theology.

After ordination as a priest of the Church of England, Clayton served as curate under Cyril Forster Garbett at St Mary's Church, Portsea, from 1910 to 1915. He then became an army chaplain in France and Flanders where, in 1915, he and another chaplain Neville Talbot opened "Talbot House", a rest house for soldiers at Poperinge, Belgium. It became known as Toc H, this being signal terminology for "T H" or "Talbot House". It closed temporarily in 1918 when the German front had drawn too close.

The spirit of friendship fostered at Toc H across social and denominational boundaries inspired Clayton, Dick Sheppard, and Alexander Paterson to set out in 1920 what became known as the Four points of the Toc H compass:

1. Friendship ("To love widely")
2. Service ("To build bravely")
3. Fair-mindedness ("To think fairly")
4. The Kingdom of God ("To witness humbly")

This followed the foundation of a new Toc H House in Kensington in 1919, followed by others in London, Manchester, and Southampton. The Toc H movement continued to grow in numbers and established, also, a women's league. In 1930, Clayton led Toc H into creative support of the British Empire Leprosy Relief Association.

From 1922 to 1962, Clayton was Vicar of All Hallows-by-the-Tower in the City of London. While working in the area, he helped to devise the Tower Hill Improvement Scheme (with Lord Wakefield of Hythe), which led to the establishment of Tower Beach, an urban beach next to the Tower of London that existed from 1934 to 1971. His work also brought him into contact with the East End of London and its frequently harsh and impoverished conditions. Two aspects of his work converged in 1940 when All Hallows was devastated by bombing during the Blitz and Clayton played a primary role in fundraising for its restoration, joining this to a general drive for raising money for the similarly devastated East End. In 1948, Clayton set up the Winant Clayton Volunteer Association to bring young Americans to London for volunteer work in honour of John G. Winant (ex-American Ambassador to the United Kingdom, who had committed suicide the year before). In 1959, the association helped to send British volunteers to America to do similar work, setting up a mutual exchange scheme that has continued to this day.

While remaining based at All Hallows, Clayton travelled widely in Britain and throughout the British Empire promoting Toc H and encouraging the foundation of new branches. He was also the chaplain to the British Petroleum Company - a duty which overlapped with his chaplaincy to the Anglo-Saxon tanker fleet during the Second World War (a position which he was particularly proud of).

He was the subject of This Is Your Life in 1958 when he was surprised by Eamonn Andrews at the BBC Television Theatre.

Clayton died on 16 December 1972. He is honoured in the Royal Army Chaplains' Museum and in "Talbot House" in Poperinge.
