= Tower Beach, London =

Former urban beach in London

Coordinates: 51.5072°N 0.0787°W

Tower Beach was an urban beach on the north bank of the River Thames in London, England, adjacent to the Tower of London, which was open to the public from 1934 to 1971.

== History ==
The Rev PTB 'Tubby' Clayton (1885–1972) was the Vicar of All Hallows-by-the-Tower from 1922 to 1962 and the founder of the Christian movement Toc H. In 1933 he and BR Leftwich published Pageant of Tower Hill (Longmans, Green & Co), which outlined a scheme to improve Tower Hill. That led to the establishment later the same year of the Tower Hill Improvement Trust. (The Trust still exists: since 2006 it has been called the Tower Hill Trust.)

One of the Trust's earliest actions was to create an artificial beach at Tower Hill at a time when trips to the seaside were a luxury for East End families. More than 1,500 barge-loads of sand were brought in to create a beach between the Tower Wharf and the Thames. The beach was opened to the public by the Lieutenant Governor of the Tower on 23 July 1934, George V decreeing that the beach was to be used by the children of London who should have "free access forever". There were rowing boats for hire.

The beach was always closed at high tide and was closed for the duration of the Second World War. It was re-opened in 1946 by the Governor of the Tower, Col Edward Hamilton Carkeet-James, but, due to river pollution, it closed in 1971. The Tower Millennium Pier is partly located on the site of the former beach.

== Open days ==
The former beach is the property of the King, as the Tower extends to the high water mark, and is not ordinarily open to the public. As part of the London Open Weekend, the remains of the beach were opened to visitors in September of each year from 2014 until 2016.
