= Knighten Guilde =

Obscure medieval guild of the City of London

The Knighten Guilde or Cnichtengild, which translates into modern English as the Knight's Guild, was an obscure Medieval guild of the City of London. According to A Survey of London by John Stow (1603), it was in origin an order of chivalry founded by the Saxon king Edgar for loyal knights.

The Portsoken Ward of the City of London has its origin in the guild's landholding outside the Aldgate, as did the Ancient Parish of St Botolph without Aldgate.

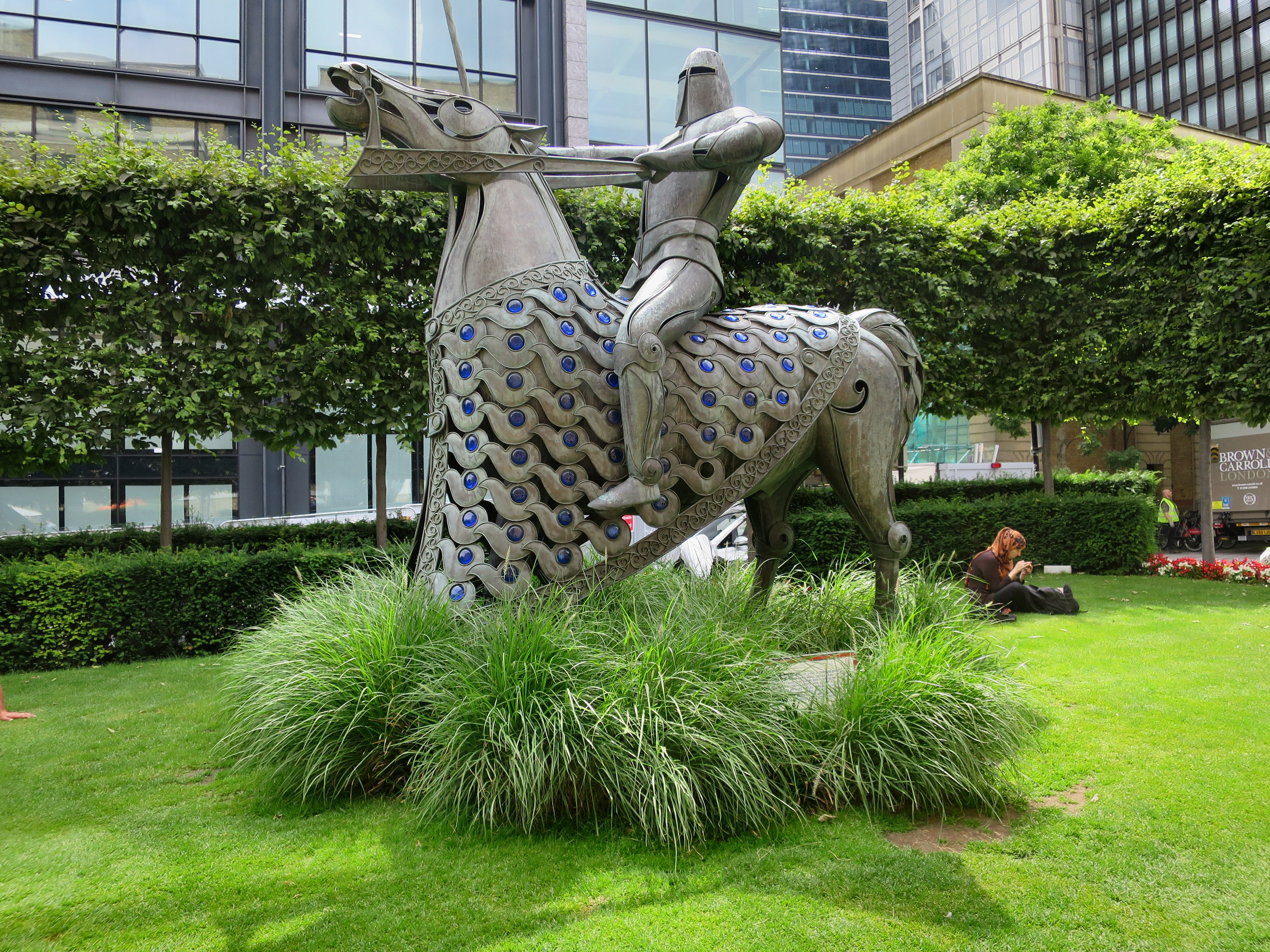
The statue at Devonshire Square, on the Portsoken's historic Ward boundary with Bishopsgate Without commemorates the Knighten Guilde

Historic extent of the Portsoken, and other City Wards. Prior to the 13th century, the Ward extended south to the Thames.

== Origin ==
They were specifically excluded from the Judicia civitatis Londoniae of 930 that united the other frith guilds of London.

According to a legend solely recorded in John Stow's Survey of London, land east of the wall was granted to the guild by King Edgar.

(In) Portsoken, which soundeth, the Franchise at the gate, was sometime a Guild, and had beginning in the dayes of King Edgar, more than 600 yeares since.

There were thirteene Knights, or Soldiers welbeloved to the king and realme, for service by them done, which requested to haue a certaine portion of land on the East part of the Citie, left desolate and forsaken by the Inhabitants, by reason of too much seruitude.

They besought the king to haue this land, with the libertie of a Guilde for euer: the king granted to their request with conditions following: that is, that each of them should victoriously accomplish three combates, one aboue the ground, one underground, and the third in the water, and after this at a certaine day in East Smithfield, they should run with Speares against all commers, all which was gloriously performed: and the same day the king named it knighten Guild...

Historic accounts of a brotherhood of 13 knights are redolent of a Cockney Camelot, but although the responsibilities of the guild were military – presumed to be to defend Aldgate and the eastern part of the City Wall from Norsemen and others – they were not the knights as the term came to be understood later in the Middle-Ages, the kind of knight typically depicted in Arthurian legend. The guild did not fight on horseback, and they didn’t have the elevated social status of later knights.

Edgar's decision to grant the land may have been influenced by his chief minister, St Dunstan, who had close links to the large neighbouring Manor of Stepney.

The guild may have responsible for the creation of St Botolph's church at Aldgate, sometime before 1115, or were at least its custodians. At one time a St Botolph dedicated church stood outside three city gates (Aldgate, Bishopsgate and Aldersgate), as well as one by the Thames at Billingsgate). These churches served as a spiritual 'checkpoint' for devotions made at the boundaries of the City. Botolph is the patron saint of trade, travel and boundaries.

The editor of Stow's Survey of London added a footnote commenting that

The Knighten guild of London is known to us only through the gift of its soke to Trinity, and the consequent preservation of the documents in the Priory Chartulary. Its true character is uncertain, and its bearing on the history of municipal institutions in London has been disputed.

In its later years the Guild simply performed religious duties, later taken on by livery companies; a Royal Commission report says:

the companies of London prove to have sprung from a number of guilds, which were associations of neighbours for the purposes of mutual assistance. Such associations were very numerous in the Middle Ages, both in town and country, and they appear to have abounded in London at a very early period. A "frith guild" and a "knighten- guild" seem to have existed in London in Anglo-Saxon times, and at the time of the Norman Conquest there were probably many other bodies of a like nature in London. Their main objects were the relief of poverty and the performance of masses for the dead.

Stow records the Guild's account, as recorded in the Liber Trinitae, claimed its charter was given by Edgar and renewed by Canute the Great, Edward the Confessor, William I, William Rufus and Henry I, but its earliest surviving records are from the latter Medieval period, namely the Charter of Liberties of Henry I. Though Stow quotes from an earlier charter from William I:

William king of England to Maurice Bishop, and Godffrey de Magum, and Richard de Parre, and to his faithfull people of London, greeting: know yee mee to have granted to the men of Knighten Guilde, the Guilde that belonged to them, and the land that belonged thereunto, with all customes, as they had the same in the time of king Edward, and my father. Witnesse hugh de Buche: at Rething.

This charter no longer seems to exist, nor does any of the others, though Stow insists that these were present when the Guild was dissolved. However he does not quote any sources other than the Liber Trinitae.

== The end of the Guild ==
Around 1115, the guild was made of fifteen members, who passed their rights and responsibilities onto Holy Trinity Priory, just inside Aldgate.

According to Stow these fifteen, the heirs of the original Knights, were

"certaine Burgesses of London, of the progenie of those Noble English knights to wit: Radulphus Fitzalgod, Wilmarde le Deuereshe, Orgare le Prude, Edward Hupcornehill, Blackstanus, and Alwine his kinsman, and Robert his brother, the sonnes of Leafstanus the Goldsmith, Wiso his sonne, Hugh Fitzvulgar, Algare Secusme..."

The guild seems to have grown in prestige over time, as the fifteen members referred to included some of London's most influential men; an alderman, a canon of St Paul's. moneyers and goldsmiths.

A more recent historian, Sydney Maddocks, summarises the Guild's end:

The members of the Knighten Guild in 1115 granted their estate to the Priory and Convent of Holy Trinity, Aldgate, which grant King Henry I confirmed. The transfer of the possessions of the Knighten Guild to Holy Trinity Priory immediately brought about trouble with Geoffrey de Mandeville, Constable of the Tower. Having taken a piece of ground in East Smithfield and made it into a vineyard, he and his successors held it by force. The situation of the vineyard cannot be identified, but it doubtless became attached to Tower Hill which it adjoined.

No reason is given in any source for the transfer, and it may either indicate the Guild had run its course or the change was part of the political and ecclesiastical changes imposed by Henry I when he seized power after the death of William Rufus.

The assumption is that the Guild was dissolved after its lands were passed on. Though according to the Livery Companies Commission, the Guild was believed to have been absorbed into London's livery companies. It certainly no longer exists, though Portsoken still exists as a ward.

The sources for Stow's account are uncertain, the only one given, Liber Trinitatis, records the views of the Order of the Holy Trinity which took over the area, and so no doubt gives a biased account.

On taking over the Guild, the Priors of Aldgate became ex-officio, the Alderman of the Portsoken. This arrangement lasted until the Priory was dissolved, during the reformation, in the 16th century.

== Legacy ==
The Portsoken Ward has its origin in the land of the guild and was in place before the Norman Conquest. The Ancient Parish of St Botolph Without Aldgate, in place since the early 12th century (perhaps before) was originally coterminous with the Portsoken. Both areas were then larger than they subsequently became, both reaching down to the Thames.

The eastern boundary of the Guilds lands lay on Nightingale Lane and the little stream that ran beside it. Nightingale Lane is believed to be a corruption of Knighten Guilde Lane. London County Council changed the street name to Sir Thomas More Street in 1937, despite Sir Thomas More having no connection to the area.

The King Edgar statue by Denys Mitchell was erected in 1990 to commemorate the guild. It is situated at Devonshire Square on the Portsoken's boundary with Bishopsgate Without.
