= Tobi Bakare =

Actor

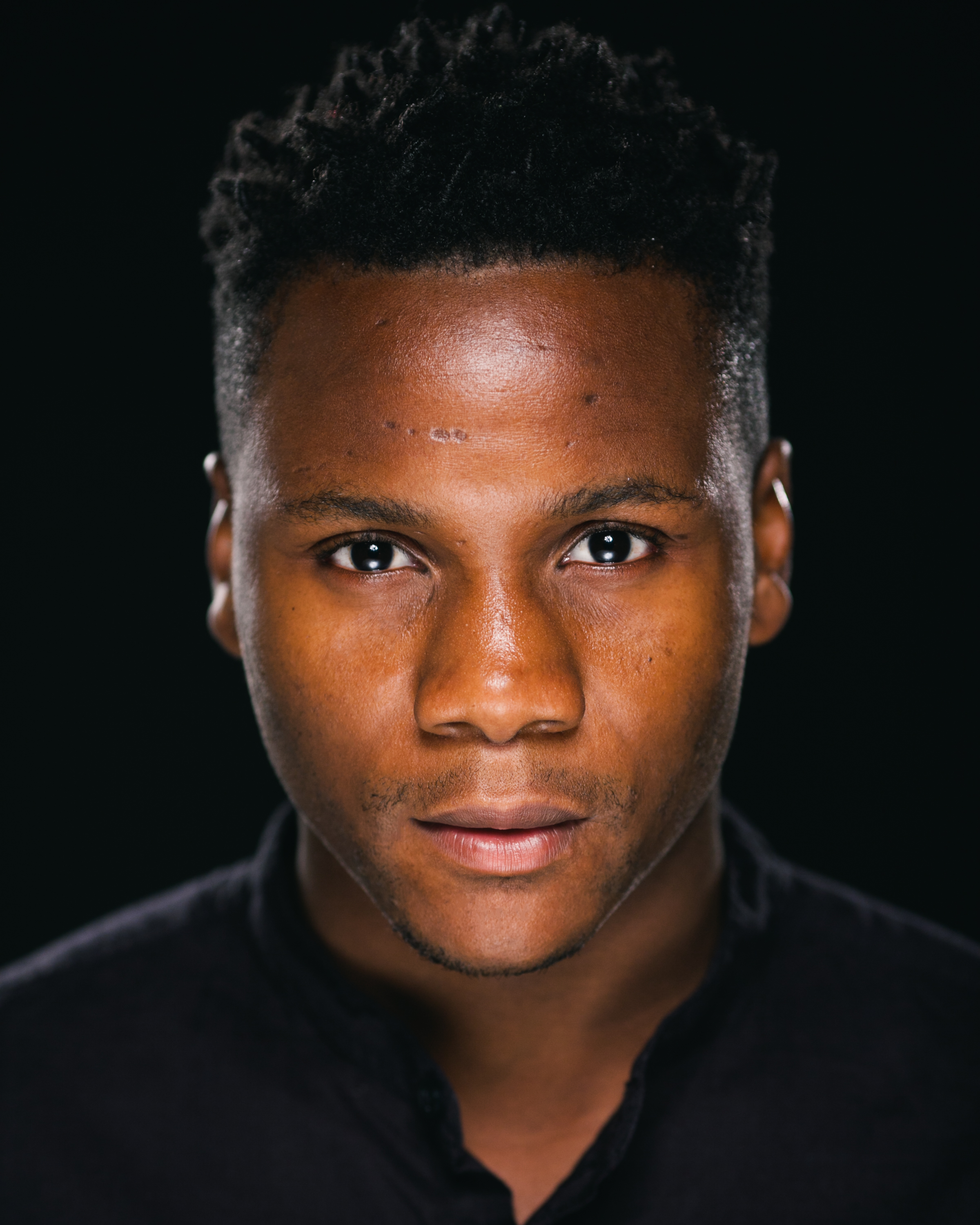
- Tobi Bakare in 2015
- Born: 1989 (age 36–37); London, England
- Education: Identity School of Acting
- Occupation: Actor
- Known for: Death in Paradise
- Spouse: Prisca Bakare (m. 2014)
- Children: 3

Tobi Bakare is known for his roles in television, such as DS JP Hooper in Death in Paradise, DC Chuks Akinade in The Tunnel, and Walter Woodcock in Outlander. He is also known in film, for his role as Jamal in both Kingsman: The Secret Service and Kingsman: Golden Circle. For the stage, he has acted in the Shakespeare play, Macbeth. Bakare has also lent his voice to the video game Assassin's Creed Origins.

== Early life ==
Tobi Bakare was born in 1989 in London, England, and grew up in Hackney, London in England. When Bakare was in secondary school the head master of Identity School of Acting, Femi Oguns, came to talk to Bakare and his classmates about the school. Tobi joined the school after hearing what Ogun had to say. While at the school Bakare studied method acting and the work of Jacques Lecoq.

== Career ==
Bakare began his acting career in a French-African version of MacBeth on stage. In television he started out by doing guest starring roles in procedurals such as Holby City, The Bill, and Silent Witness. He also had a regular role in the miniseries, The Tunnel. In film he starred in both Kingsman movies, Kingsman: The Secret Service and Kingsman: The Golden Circle as the main character, Eggsy's friend Jamal. He has done voice over work on the video game Assassin's Creed Origins.

For the television program Death in Paradise, which he started in 2015, he was cast as DS JP Hooper. He described JP as innocent. Furthermore, he said that JP was dedicated to his wife, and growing family. Hooper would be a main character on the show for six seasons, from seasons 4 to 10, leaving in 2021. After leaving the regular cast, he would return to do guest spots in subsequent years, the latest of which was in 2025.

Bakare started an acting service in 2016 called Wrought Artisan. The organization prepares up and coming actors to be working actors within the film and television industry.

In 2023 he would take on the role of Walter Woodcock in Starz's Outlander. Bakare's Walter Woodcock's main story line was that he was to be treated for a leg injury by one of the shows main protagonists Claire Fraser. Fans lamented online when he was unceremoniously killed off as a result of a pulmonary embolism, created by the leg injury, despite his simple wish to dance with his wife one last time.

== Personal life ==
Bakare spoke about his strong Christian faith on the radio show Gospel Drive. Tobi Bakare is of Nigerian descent.

He married his wife Prisca in 2014. They have 3 children.

While filming Death in Paradise, Bakare would spend 6 months out of the year living in Guadeloupe.

== Selected filmography ==
=== Television ===
- Outlander as Walter Woodcock
- Death In Paradise as J.P. Hooper
- The Tunnel as DC Chuks Akinade
- Silent Witness as Abdi
- The Bill as Anthony Watts
- Holby City as Semper Maynard

=== Film ===
- KINGSMAN: GOLDEN CIRCLE as Jamal
- KINGSMAN: SECRET SERVICE as Jamal
- THE SOMNAMBULISTS as Man 5

=== Stage ===
- Macbeth as Fleance
