= St Botolph's Aldgate =

- St Botolph without Aldgate and Holy Trinity Minories
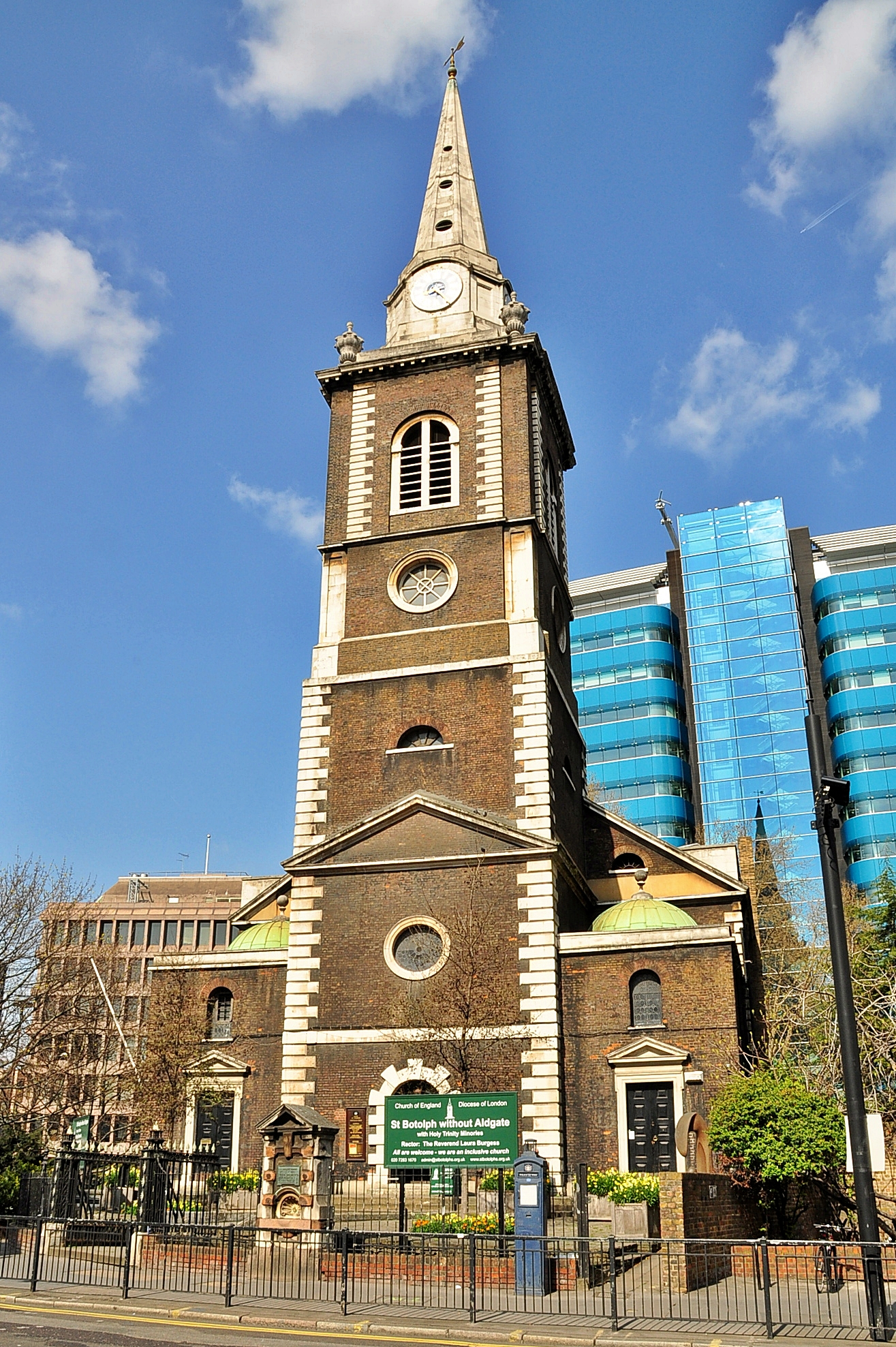

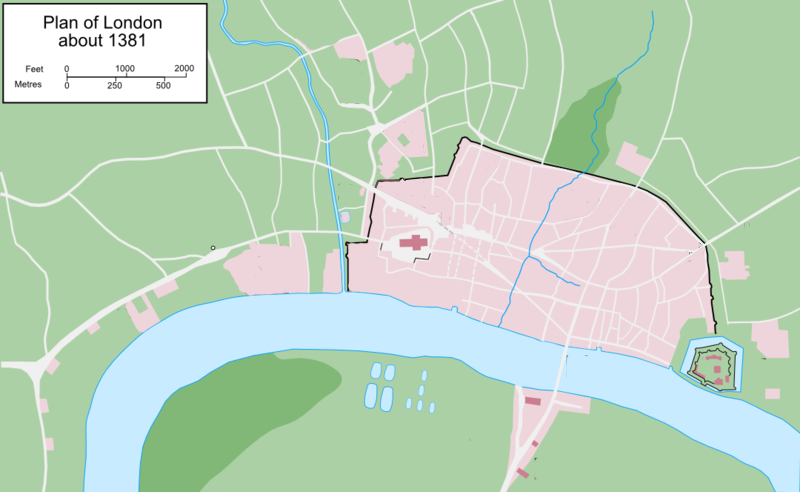
- Location within City of London Location within City of London in 1300
- 51°30′50″N 00°04′34″W
- Location: Aldgate High Street, London, EC3
- Country: England
- Language: English
- Denomination: Church of England
- Previous denomination: Roman Catholic (to 1534)
- Churchmanship: Liberal / Modern Catholic
- Website: stbotolphs.org.uk

History
- Status: Active
- Founded: 11th century or earlier
- Dedication: Botolph of Thorney

Architecture
- Functional status: Parish church
- Heritage designation: Grade I listed building
- Architect: George Dance the Elder
- Architectural type: Georgian
- Years built: 1115; 16th century; 1741
- Completed: 1744

Administration
- Diocese: London
- Archdeaconry: London
- Deanery: City of London
- Parish: St Botolph without Aldgate

Clergy
- Bishop: Bishop of London
- Rector: Laura Burgess

St Botolph's Aldgate is a Church of England parish church in the City of London and also, as it lies outside the line of the city's former eastern walls, a part of the East End of London. The church served the ancient parish of St Botolph without Aldgate which included the extramural Portsoken Ward of the City of London, as well as East Smithfield which is outside the City.

The full name of the church is St Botolph without Aldgate and Holy Trinity Minories and it is sometimes known simply as Aldgate Church. The ecclesiastical parish was united with that of the Church of Holy Trinity, Minories, in 1899.

The current 18th-century church building is made of brick with stone quoins and window casings. The tower is square with an obelisk spire.

== Position and dedication ==
The church stands at the junction of Houndsditch and Aldgate High Street and is approximately 30 yards outside the former position of Aldgate, a defensive barbican on the London Wall, laying in the East End of London instead.

The church was one of four in medieval London dedicated to Saint Botolph or Botwulf, a 7th-century East Anglian saint, each of which stood by one of the gates to the City. The other three were the near neighbour St Botolph-without-Bishopsgate (outside Bishopsgate), as well as St Botolph's Aldersgate (outside Aldersgate) and St Botolph's, Billingsgate by the riverside (near London Bridge – this church was destroyed by the Great Fire of London in 1666 and not rebuilt).

It is believed the church just outside Aldgate is the first in London to have been dedicated to Botolph, with the other dedications following soon after. The priory just inside Aldgate was founded by clergy from St. Botolph's Priory in Colchester, just under fifty miles along the Roman Road from Aldgate. The Priory at Colchester, like the church at Aldgate (though not the Priory at Aldgate), lay just outside the South Gate (also known as St Botolph's Gate) in Colchester's Wall. The Priors held the land of the Portsoken, outside the wall, and are thought to have built and dedicated the church, St Botolph without Aldgate, that served it. The church of St Botolph's Church, Cambridge just outside the south gate of that city, may in turn, have taken its dedication from St Botolph-without-Bishopsgate to which it was linked by Ermine Street.

By the end of the 11th century, Botolph was regarded as the patron saint of boundaries, and by extension of trade and travel. This association with travel was particularly strong before the legend of Saint Christopher became popular. These aspects of Botolph's patronage are thought to be the reason why churches at the City gates have this dedication.

== History ==
=== Medieval church ===
The earliest known written record of the church dates from 1115, when it was received by the Holy Trinity Priory (recently founded by Matilda, wife of Henry I) but the parochial foundations may very well date from before 1066.

The church was rebuilt in the 16th century at the cost of the priors of the Holy Trinity, and renovated in 1621. It escaped the Great Fire of London, and was described at the beginning of the 18th century as "an old church, built of Brick, Rubble and Stone, rendered over, and ... of the Gothick order". The building, as it stood at that time, was 78-foot long (24 m) and 53-foot wide (16 m). There was a tower, about 100-foot tall (30 m), with six bells.

=== Eighteenth century ===
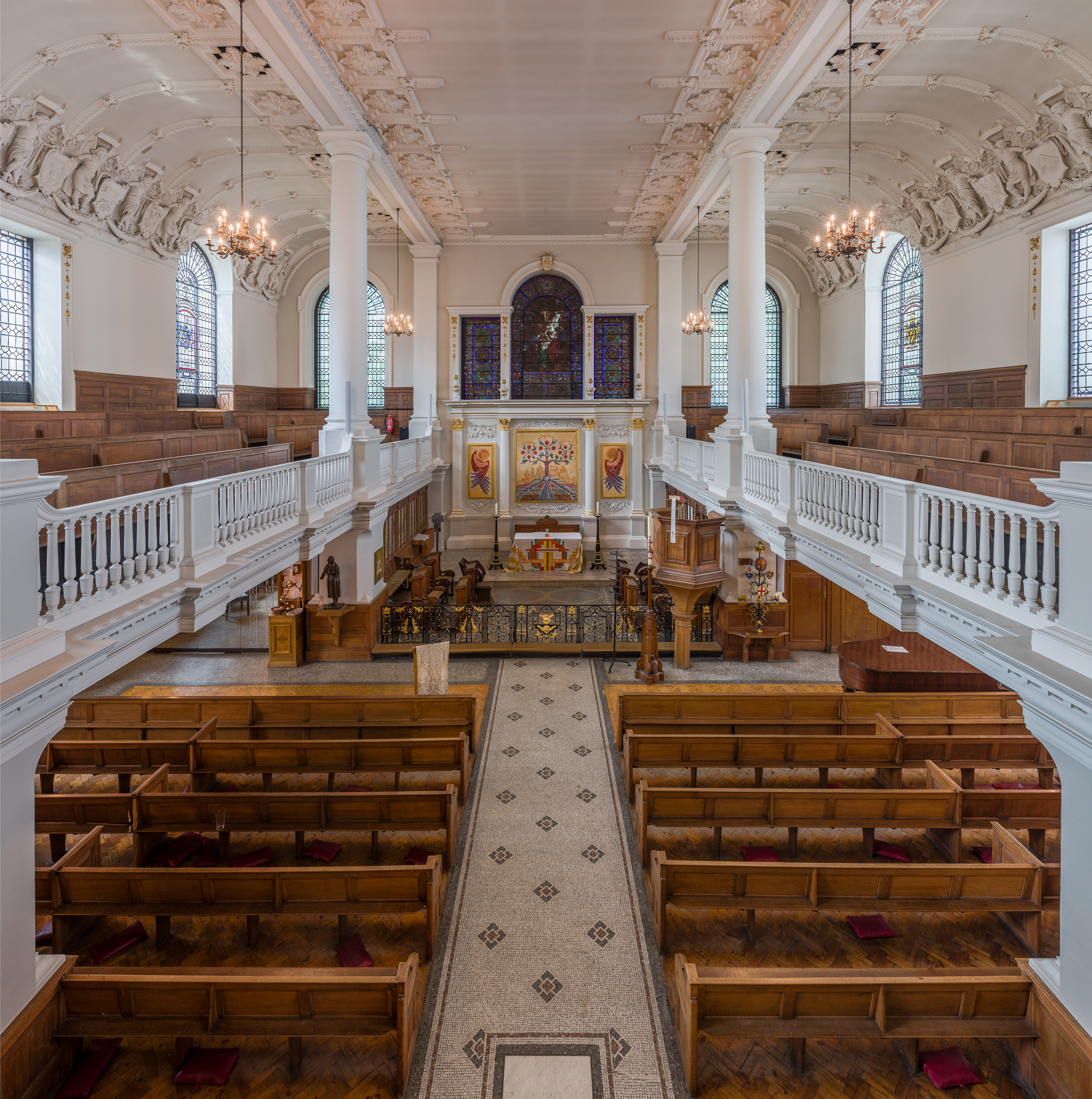
The church interior looking north-west

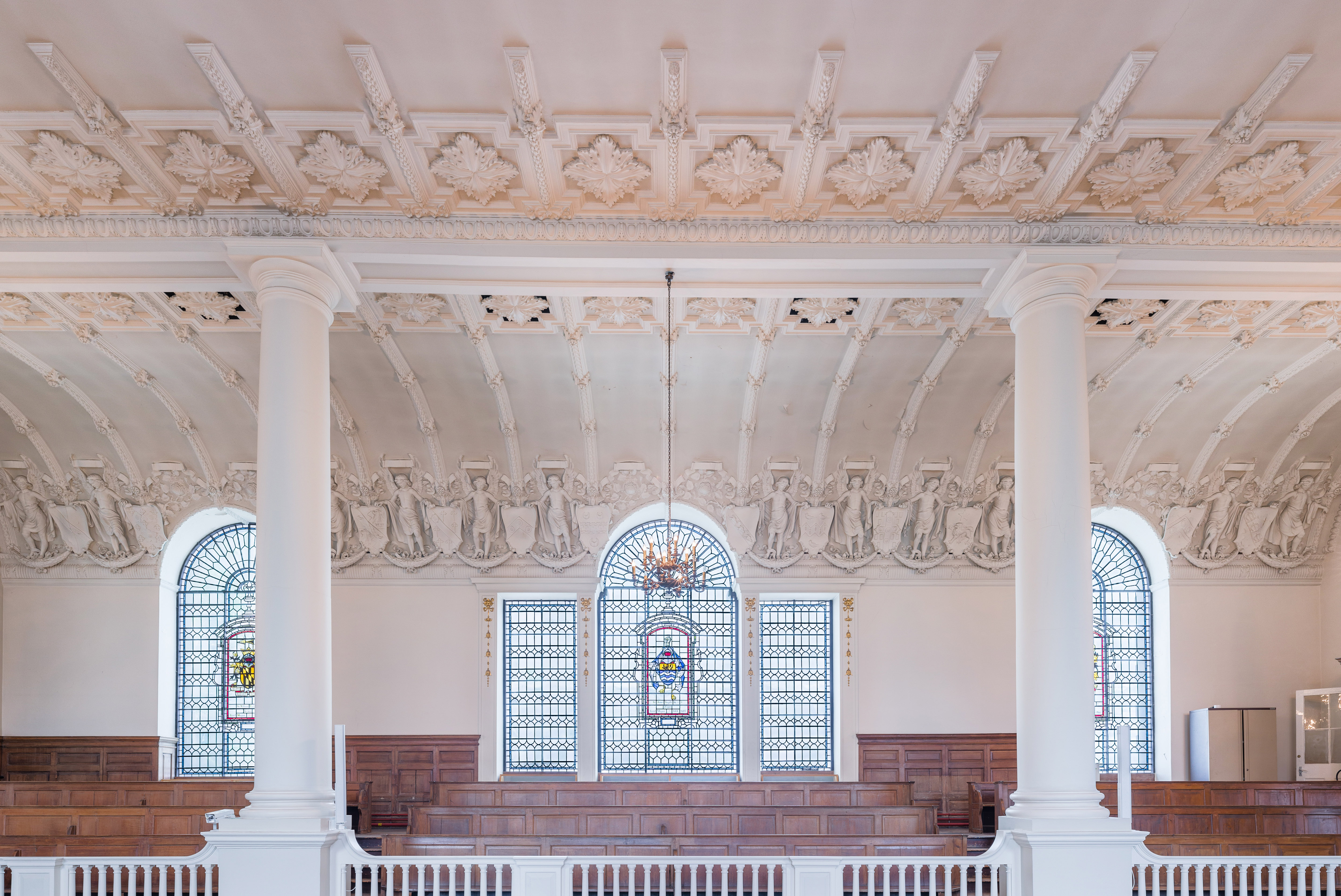
Ceiling detail

St Botolph's was completely rebuilt between 1741 and 1744, to a design by George Dance the Elder. The exterior is of brick with projecting quoins, stone windows surrounds and a stone cornice. The tower, also of brick, has rusticated quoins, and a stone spire. The interior of the building is divided into nave and aisles by four widely spaced piers supporting a flat ceiling. There are galleries along three sides. The church is lit by two rows of windows in each side wall, one above and one below the gallery. The monuments from the old building were preserved, and reinstalled in the new church.

=== Nineteenth century ===
The interior was redecorated by John Francis Bentley, the architect of Westminster Cathedral in the late 19th century.

St Botolph's was often referred to as the "Church of Prostitutes" in the late Victorian period. The church is sited on an island surrounded by roadways and it was usual in these times to be suspicious of women standing on street corners. They were easy targets for the police, and to escape arrest the prostitutes would parade around the island, now occupied by the church and Aldgate tube station.

The earliest record of the churchyard is in 1230; by 1875 it was being used as a public open space. The landscape gardener Fanny Wilkinson laid it out as a public garden in 1892. A drinking fountain, still extant, was installed in 1906 to the memory of the philanthropist Frederic Mocatta.

The parish was united with that of Holy Trinity, Minories when it closed in 1899. St Botolph's inherited from that church a preserved head, reputed to be that of Henry Grey, 1st Duke of Suffolk, who had been executed for treason by Queen Mary I in 1554. During an archaeological investigation of the crypt in 1990, a preserved head, reputed to be Grey's, was rediscovered and buried in the churchyard.

It is mentioned in the traditional rhyme "Oranges and Lemons" (18th century): 'Old Father Baldpate, Say the slow bells at Aldgate.' "Bald-pate" means "bald head," referencing Botolph's tonsure as a monk. It may also be an allusion to the glans penis, as St Botolph's was notorious in the 18th and 19th centuries for being a meeting-place for prostitutes and their clients, earning it the nickname "Church of Prostitutes."

=== Twentieth century ===
The church was severely bombed at intervals during the Blitz in the Second World War. The church was designated a Grade I listed building on 4 January 1950.

Following its restoration by Rodney Tatchell, the church was much damaged by an unexplained fire in 1965, necessitating further restoration.

St Botolph's was rehallowed on 8 November 1966 by the Bishop of London, in the presence of Queen Elizabeth The Queen Mother and Sir Robert Bellinger, the Lord Mayor of London, who attended in state.

In the early 1970s, the crypt of the church served as a homeless shelter at night, and by day a youth club for Asian boys.

== Organ ==
The organ by Renatus Harris was built in the early 18th century. It has undergone a historical restoration by the organ builders Goetze and Gwynn, and been returned to its 1744 specification using many of the original components. The organ has been described as the oldest church organ in the United Kingdom. Although there are older pipes and cases, this is the oldest collection of pipes in their original positions on their original wind chests. Because of its historic importance, the organ was filmed and recorded for the documentary The Elusive English Organ.

Donated by Thomas Whiting in 1676, it was built between 1702 and 1704. It was enhanced for the new church (the current building) by Harris' son-in-law, John Byfield, in 1740. The organ was considerably enlarged several times in the 19th century and again rebuilt by Mander Organs in the 1960s. The decision to restore the instrument was taken by St Botolph's in 2002 after which a fundraising campaign was launched. The restoration, which took nine months, was carried out under the consultancy of Ian Bell and the workshops of Goetze and Gwynn in Welbeck, Nottinghamshire. The instrument was reinstalled in May 2006.

== Notable parishioners ==
- Daniel Defoe was married in the church in 1683
- Thomas Bray, founder of SPCK, was rector from 1706 to 1730
- Adam Derkinderen, d. 1572, son of the 16th-century publisher of the Bible, Lenaert Der Kinderen

== Other burials ==
- Thomas Darcy, 1st Baron Darcy de Darcy
