= East Smithfield =

Coordinates: 51.508355°N 0.070821°W

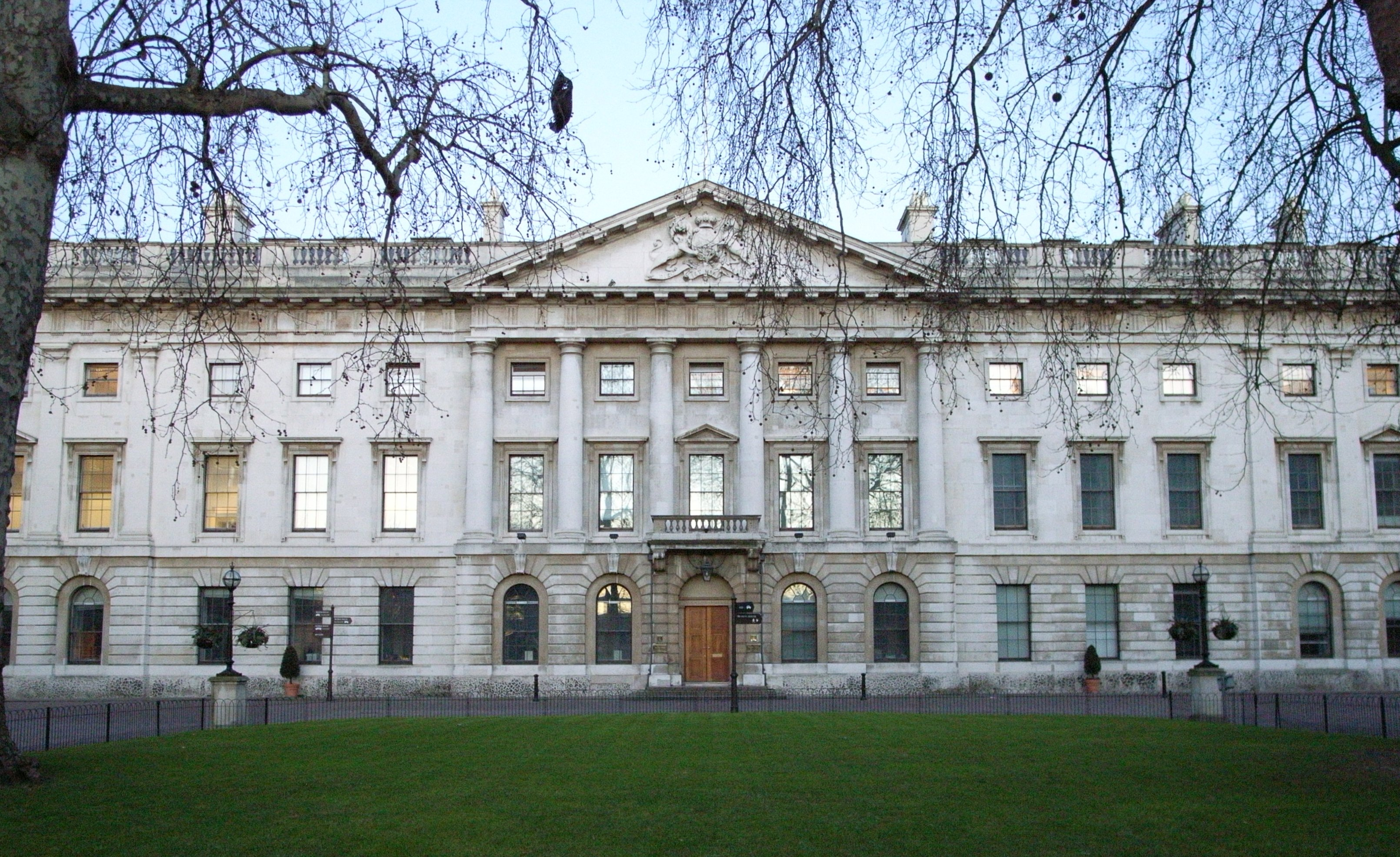
- Royal Mint Court

- Location within Greater London
- London borough: Tower Hamlets
- Ceremonial county: Greater London
- Region: London
- Country: England
- Sovereign state: United Kingdom
- Post town: LONDON
- Postcode district: E1
- Dialling code: 020
- Police: Metropolitan
- Fire: London
- Ambulance: London
- London Assembly: City and East

East Smithfield is a small locality in the London Borough of Tower Hamlets, east London, and also a short street, a part of the A1203 road. Once broader in scope, the name came to apply to the part of the ancient parish of St Botolph without Aldgate that was outside of the City of London.

The old Royal Mint and the eastern part of St Katherine's Docks are located in the district.

== The street ==
The street runs eastward from Tower Hill, with the name changing to The Highway after quarter of a mile. The street is on the route of both the London Marathon and the London Triathlon. At one time the street was known as Upper East Smithfield with the eastern part of St Katharine's Way (the part within East Smithfield) known as Lower East Smithfield.

== History of the district ==
=== Civil and ecclesiastical administration ===
==== Portsoken Ward ====
John Stow recounts the origin of the area from the Liber Trinitae, where the Saxon King Edgar was petitioned by 13 knights to grant them the wasteland to the East of the city wall, desiring to form a guild. The request was said to be granted on condition that each knight should

"accomplish three combats, one above the ground, one below the ground, and the third in the water; after this, at a certain day in East Smithfield, they should run with spears against all comers; all of which was gloriously performed; and the same day the King named it Knighten Guilde, and so bounded it from Ealdgate (Aldgate) to the place where the bars now are toward the east, &c. and again toward the south unto to the river of Thames, and so into the water, and throw his speare; so that all East Smithfield, with the right part of the street that goeth by Dodding Pond into the Thames and also the hospital of St Katherin's, with the mills that were founded in King Stephen's daies, and the outward stone wall, and the new ditch of the Tower, are of the saide fee and liberbertie."

The strip of land became known as the Portsoken, an extramural ward of the City of London which originally extended as far south of the Thames. The name East Smithfield - derived from smoothfield - was applied to an area corresponding, either exactly or approximately, to the Portsoken. Portsoken later lost its southern, riverside, section and the term East Smithfield was subsequently applied only to the part taken out of the Portsoken.

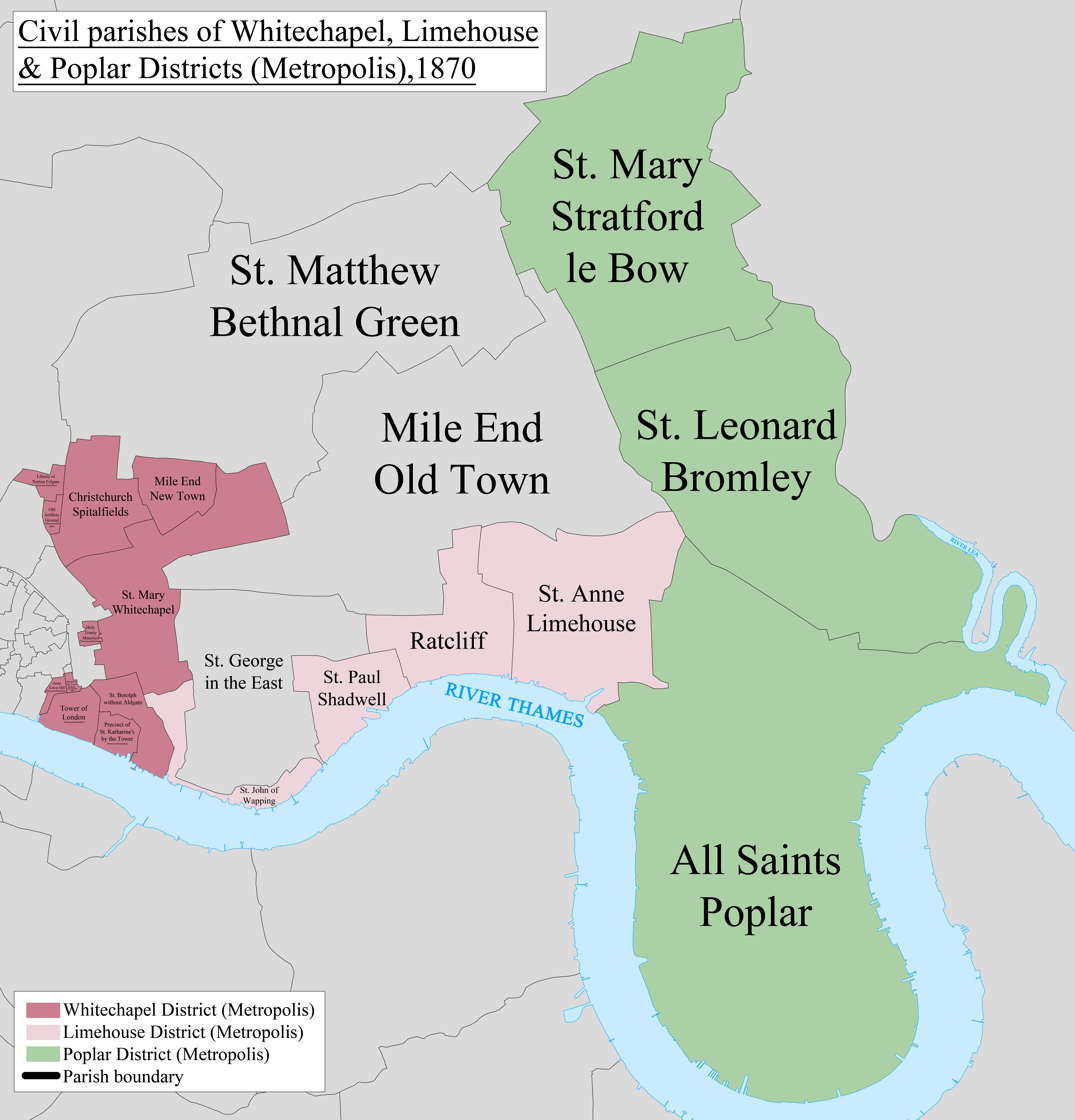

East Smithfield is the part of the Parish of St Botolph Without Aldgate outside the City (in red). The remainder of the parish, to the north is the extramural City Ward of Portsoken (unlabelled, in grey)

==== Land ownership and privileges ====
Later, Edward the Confessor confirmed the liberties upon the heirs, and these were again confirmed in the reign of William Rufus.

By 1115, during the reign of Henry I, the entire soke, or liberty, was given to the church of Holy Trinity within Aldgate, which had been founded in 1107 by Matilda, Henry's Queen. The prior of the Abbey was then to sit as an ex officio Alderman of London. The gift was not without problems. The Constable of the Tower, Geoffrey de Mandeville had cultivated a piece of ground in East Smithfield, adjacent to the Tower, as a vineyard. He refused to give it up and defended it with the garrison.

The southern part of East Smithfield was given by Holy Trinity Priory as a site for the Hospital of St Katharine, founded by Matilda (wife of Stephen of England), in 1148. Further foundations were bestowed by Eleanor (widow of Henry III) and Philippa (wife of Edward III). The importance of the hospital was such that the whole of East Smithfield came to be deemed within the Precinct of St Katharine.

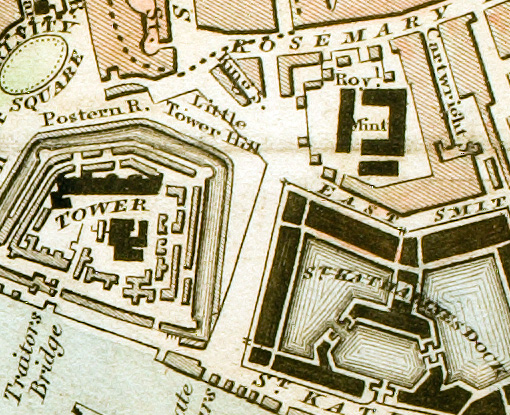
Map showing the Tower of London, St Katharine Docks and the Royal Mint. The latter moved from the Tower of London to new premises c.1809

A further monastic house was the Abbey of St Mary Graces (or Eastminster), but this seems not to have had an administrative unit associated with it.

From 1855, the whole area of the former East Smithfield was reunited under the administration of the Whitechapel District.

==== County functions ====
The area was part of the historic (or ancient) county of Middlesex, but military and most (or all) civil county functions were managed more locally, by the Tower Division (also known as the Tower Hamlets), under the leadership of the Lord-Lieutenant of the Tower Hamlets (the post was always filled by the Constable of the Tower of London).

The role of the Tower Division ended when East Smithfield became part of the new County of London in 1889. The County of London was replaced by Greater London in 1965.

=== Plague ===
Between 1347 and 1351, the Black Death struck the City. Two cemeteries were opened in East Smithfield to take the dead from London. During the epidemic, 200 bodies a day were buried, in mass graves, stacked five deep. In 2007, a study led by the University of Albany, NY exhumed and examined 490 skeletons – finding that the disease afflicted disproportionately the already weak and malnourished.

=== Migration ===
By 1236 Jews were settled in the area for protection by the Tower garrison — until their expulsion in 1290. It's not entirely clear if the settled in East Smithfield, St Katharine's or both.

In common with the neighbouring St Katharine's Precinct, the parish has had a diverse population since the medieval period.

This pattern of diversity continued, during the late 16th and early 17th centuries the parish of St Botolph without Aldgate as a whole (both the Portsoken and East Smithfield areas) is recorded as having a population of at least 25 people identified as "blackamoors."

They appear to have arrived as a result of the war with Spain, being freed from Spanish slave ships, or slavery in Spanish colonies, by English warships. These free black Londoners, some of whom had mixed African and Spanish ancestry, often found work as sailors or interpreters. Many were servants and one appears to have worked at the Whitechapel Bell Foundry. The parish records from that time also reveal the presence of French, Dutch and Indian residents as well as at least one Persian and one East Indian (Bengali).

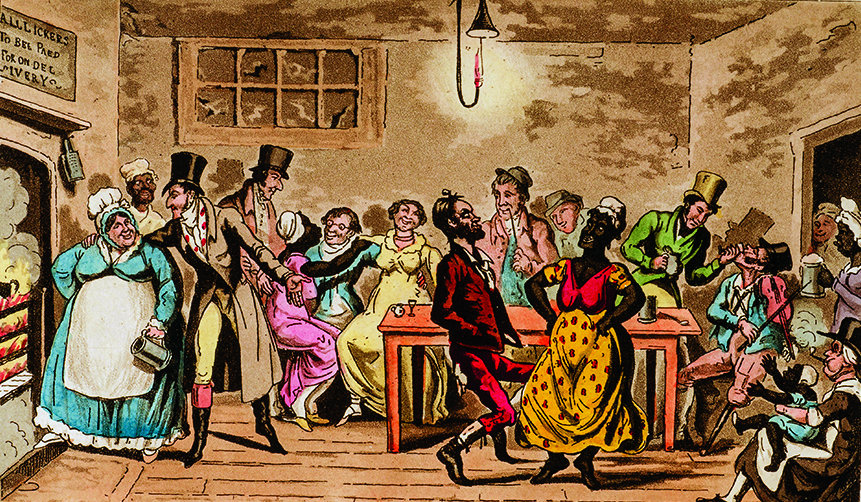
"Tom, Jerry & Logic amongst the unsophisticated sons & daughters of nature in the East" - an illustration of Pierce Egan's work by George Cruikshank. The picture shows the Coach and Horses public house in East Smithfield. The racial mix of the community is evident.

The continuation of the black presence is illustrated from a court record from 1787, which noted that constables trying to make an arrest at the Shovel public house in East Smithfield, were ejected by the landlord and more than forty black drinkers.

Around 1821 the writer Pierce Egan wrote a semi-autobiographical account of a visit to the Coach and Horses public house on Nightingale Lane (now called Thomas More Street) in East Smithfield. The story tells of three upper class friends who tiring of high society events decide to “see a bit of life at the East End of Town”. Egan compares the East Ends informal egalitarian nightlife favourably to the formality of the West End.

every cove that put in his appearance was quite welcome, colour or country considered no obstacle...the group motley indeed; Lascars, blacks, jack tars, coalheavers, dustmen, women of colour, old and young, and a sprinkling of the remnants of once fine girls, &c. were all jigging together

— Pierce Egan, The True History of Tom & Jerry: or, Life in London (1821)

=== Poverty and philanthropy ===
In 1844, "An Association for promoting Cleanliness among the Poor" was established, and they built a bath-house and laundry in Glasshouse Yard. This cost a single penny for bathing or washing, and by June 1847 was receiving 4,284 people a year. This led to an act of Parliament to encourage other municipalities to build their own, and the model spread quickly throughout the East End. Timbs noted that "... so strong was the love of cleanliness thus encouraged that women often toiled to wash their own and their children's clothing, who had been compelled to sell their hair to purchase food to satisfy the cravings of hunger".

=== Economic Activity ===
A Pentecost fair was granted in the district in 1229. The Royal Mint moved from the Tower of London, to a site at the end of East Smithfield in 1809. Today, this building, by Robert Smirke and its gatehouse are all that remain; the rest being swept away by continual expansion, until in November 1975, the London Mint was closed and production transferred to Wales. The site is intended to become the new Chinese Embassy.

In 1828, the entirety of Katharine's district, as well as southern East Smithfield were swept away to allow the construction of St Katharine Docks. Around 11,000 people were evicted and had to find new homes.

== Notable people ==
- Edmund Spenser, poet, born in East Smithfield around 1552.

== See also ==
- Smithfield, London - Sometimes referred to as West Smithfield

== Transport ==
The nearest Docklands Light Railway station is Tower Gateway.

The nearest London Underground station is Tower Hill on the District and Circle lines.
