= Thomas More Street =

Thomas More Street, formerly Nightingale Lane, is a short winding road in the London Borough of Tower Hamlets. It is situated between St Katharine Docks to the west and Wapping to the east.

It was formerly the course of a brook, one of the lost rivers of London, whose name is not certain, but may have been Cropat's Ditch.

== Toponymy and renaming ==
The name Nightingale Lane is first known to have been recorded as Nechtingal Leane in 1543. The name is thought to derive from the Cnihtengild, a brotherhood of local knights who owned the land that would become the parish of St Botolph without Aldgate.

London County Council renamed the street in 1930s as part of a major programme of renaming across the LCC area - the LCC did not want duplicated street names in different parts of the capital. Sir Thomas More had no particular connection to the street.

== The brook ==
The source, or sources, of the brook are not known for certain, but one of the headwaters may have risen at Wellclose Square, and entered the Thames at or close to the Hermitage Entrance (to the London Dock).

The name of the brook, which ran alongside the street, is uncertain, but may have been Cropat's Ditch.

There were tidal mills on the brook, known as the Cressemills in 1233 and later as the Crashmills. Nearby was a hermitage known as the Swan-nest, suggesting an isolated position amid reedbeds. The Hermitage gave its name to a number of local features such as the Hermitage basin and the Hermitage Entrance.

=== Boundary feature ===
The lane and brook were the historical boundary between:

West side: The East Smithfield area of the extra-mural parish of St Botolph without Aldgate. East Smithfield was the part of the parish outside of the City of London - with the rest being within the City's Portsoken Ward. At a very early date, the whole of the parish of St Botolph was within the Portsoken Ward of the City. St Katharine Dock and its associated buildings occupy the part of East Smithfield immediately west of the road.

East Side: The Parish of St John - one of two Wapping parishes. For a time the Parish of St John was known as Wapping-Whitechapel and was attached to Whitechapel. Before that it had, with the rest of Whitechapel, been a part of the Manor and Parish of Stepney

== Events ==
On Friday 29 July 1629, King Charles I unexpectedly arrived in the street. The King had been hunting in the southern part of Epping Forest, at Wanstead in Essex. The king's party chased a stag (possibly a hind) six or seven miles and made the kill in a garden on the east side of the Lane. The hunt and the large crowd of onlookers it attracted are recorded as doing great damage to the householders' herb garden. The local tradition is that the King and his party afterward visited a nearby inn, called the Red Lion Inn, to take some ale in the saddle.

During the anti-Catholic Gordon Riots of 1780, a chapel on the west side of the street was destroyed by rioters.

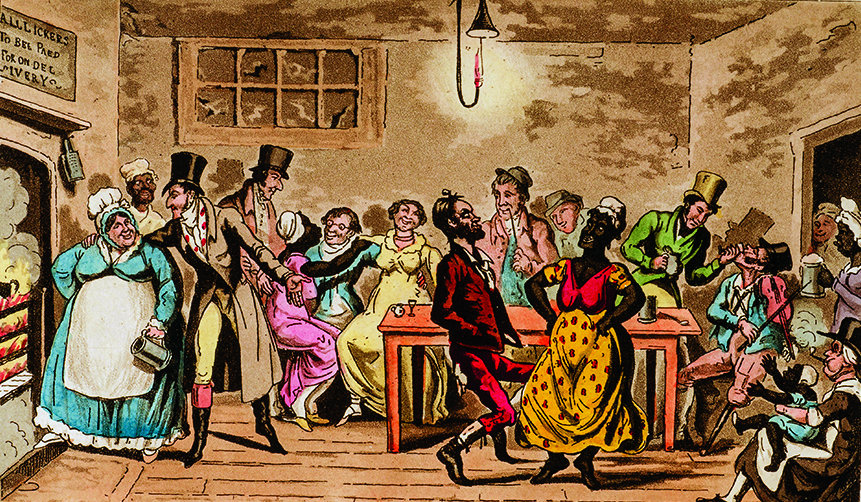
"Tom, Jerry & Logic amongst the unsophisticated sons & daughters of nature in the East" - an illustration of Pierce Egan's work by George Cruikshank. The picture shows the Coach and Horses public house in East Smithfield. The racial mix of the community is evident.

Around 1821 the writer Pierce Egan wrote a semi-autobiographical account of a visit to the Coach and Horses public house on Nightingale Lane. Egan compared the East End's informal egalitarian nightlife favourably to the formality of the West End.

every cove that put in his appearance was quite welcome, colour or country considered no obstacle...the group motley indeed; Lascars, blacks, jack tars, coalheavers, dustmen, women of colour, old and young, and a sprinkling of the remnants of once fine girls, &c. were all jigging together

— Pierce Egan, The True History of Tom & Jerry: or, Life in London (1821)

=== Creation of the docks ===
The area had always been dependent on the maritime trades, but in the early 19th century the dominance of sea-borne commerce utterly transformed it when the long established neighbourhoods on either side of the street were largely demolished to make way for docks.

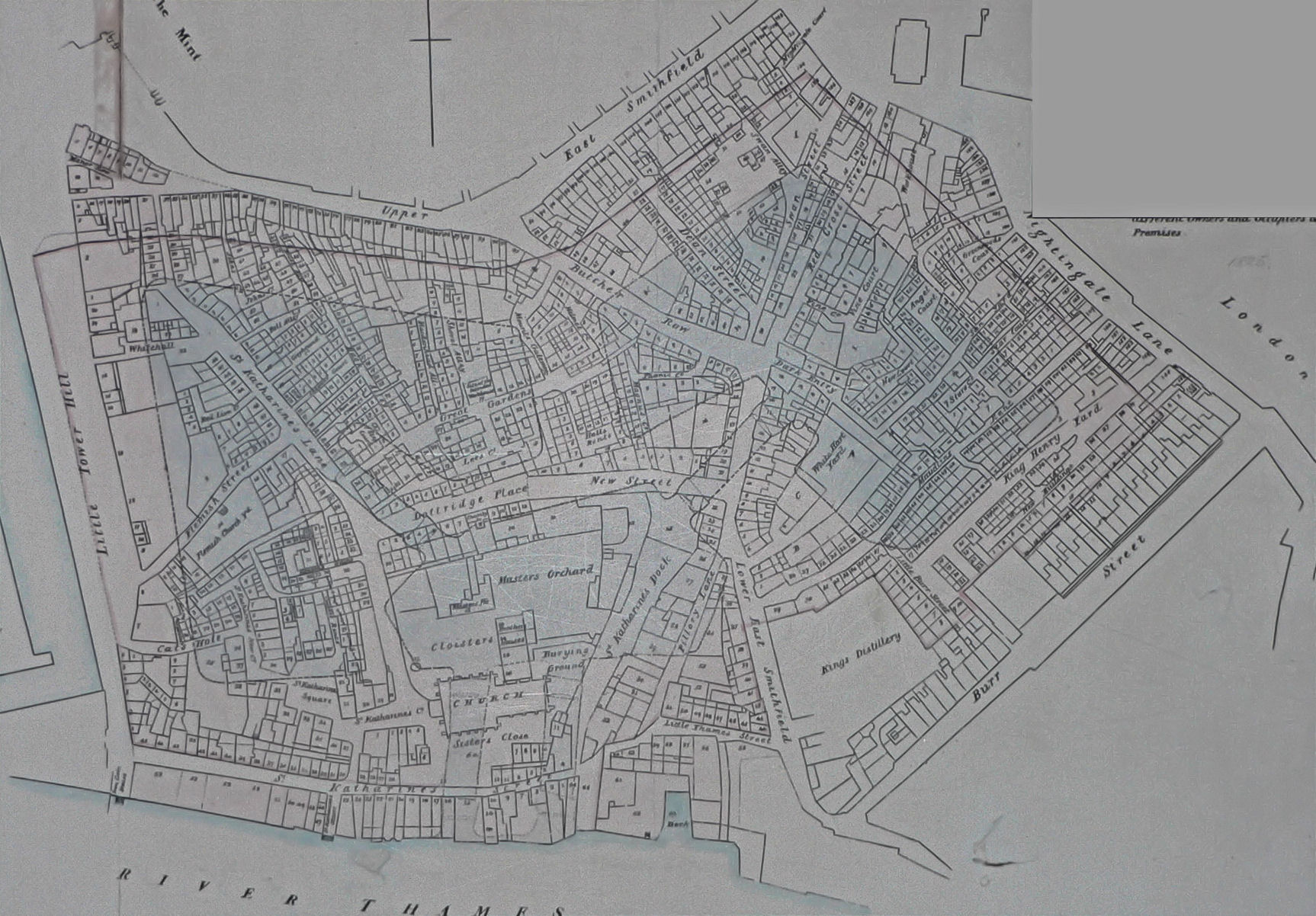
St Katharine Dock

The London Docks, to the east, opened in 1805 and St Katharine Docks, to the west were opened in 1828. The community was displaced to neighbouring parts of the East End, and a densely packed area of housing became a place of work. The once vibrant street was now closely penned in by the high dockyard walls on either side.
