= Identity School of Acting =

Drama school

Coordinates: 34.09093°N 118.30885°W

- Type: Drama School
- Established: 2003
- Students: 900
- Location: 21-25 Beehive Place, Brixton, London SW9 7QR, England
- Nickname: IDSA
- Website: Identity School of Acting

Identity School of Acting Los Angeles
- Established: 2018
- Students: 300
- Location: Thymele Arts, 5481 Santa Monica Blvd, Los Angeles, CA 90029, U.S.

The Identity School of Acting (IDSA) is a part-time drama school that was founded in London, England by Femi Oguns in 2003. A second branch and campus opened in Los Angeles, California in 2018.

Identity School of Acting began in 2003 with 10 students at the Arcola Theatre in Hackney. Although open to prospective students of all ethnicities, Oguns founded the institution with the intent of reaching out to black and minority actors and promoting the diversity of the real world on stage and onscreen, as well as holding casting directors to account due to the lack of opportunity he had found in his own early acting experiences. The school later moved to Holborn, and then again to Brixton, as well as offering online classes. The school offers part-time acting training starting at age 16.

The school is affiliated with Identity Agency Group, which was established in 2006. However, the agency is a separate entity; not all students and alumni are necessarily represented by the agency, and not every actor represented by IAG is necessarily a student or alumnus of IDSA.

The Los Angeles branch of Identity School was launched in 2018 with alumni John Boyega, Letitia Wright, Malachi Kirby, Damson Idris, and Melanie Liburd as patrons of the new faculty. Oguns and Boyega launched a production arm of the institution, Identity Filmworks, in 2019.

== Notable people ==
- Femi Oguns, founder

=== Alumni ===
==== London ====
- Adelayo Adedayo
- Samuel Adewunmi
- Jordan Alexandra
- Shaquille Ali-Yebuah
- Simone Ashley
- Tobi Bakare
- Moe Bar-El
- John Boyega
- Simona Brown
- Sophia Brown
- Michaela Coel
- Noeleen Comiskey
- Áine Rose Daly
- Jourdan Dunn
- Leonie Elliott
- Fola Evans-Akingbola
- Amelia Eve
- Tanya Fear
- Sophie Hopkins
- Damson Idris
- Osy Ikhile
- Priya Kansara
- Armin Karima
- Malachi Kirby
- Martin Bobb-Semple
- Jessie Mei Li
- Melanie Liburd
- Judi Love
- Tahj Miles
- Zackary Momoh
- Rukku Nahar
- Weruche Opia
- Regé-Jean Page
- Chance Perdomo
- Vivian Panka
- Aaron Phagura
- Jessica Plummer
- Scribz Riley
- Varada Sethu
- Tahirah Sharif
- Amarah-Jae St. Aubyn
- Armin Karima
- Lydia West
- Letitia Wright
- Xelia Mendes-Jones

==== Los Angeles ====
- Ivan Mbakop
- Matthew Law
- Sonya Balmores
