= Middlesex Street Estate =

Housing estate in London

Coordinates: 51.5159°N 0.0766°W

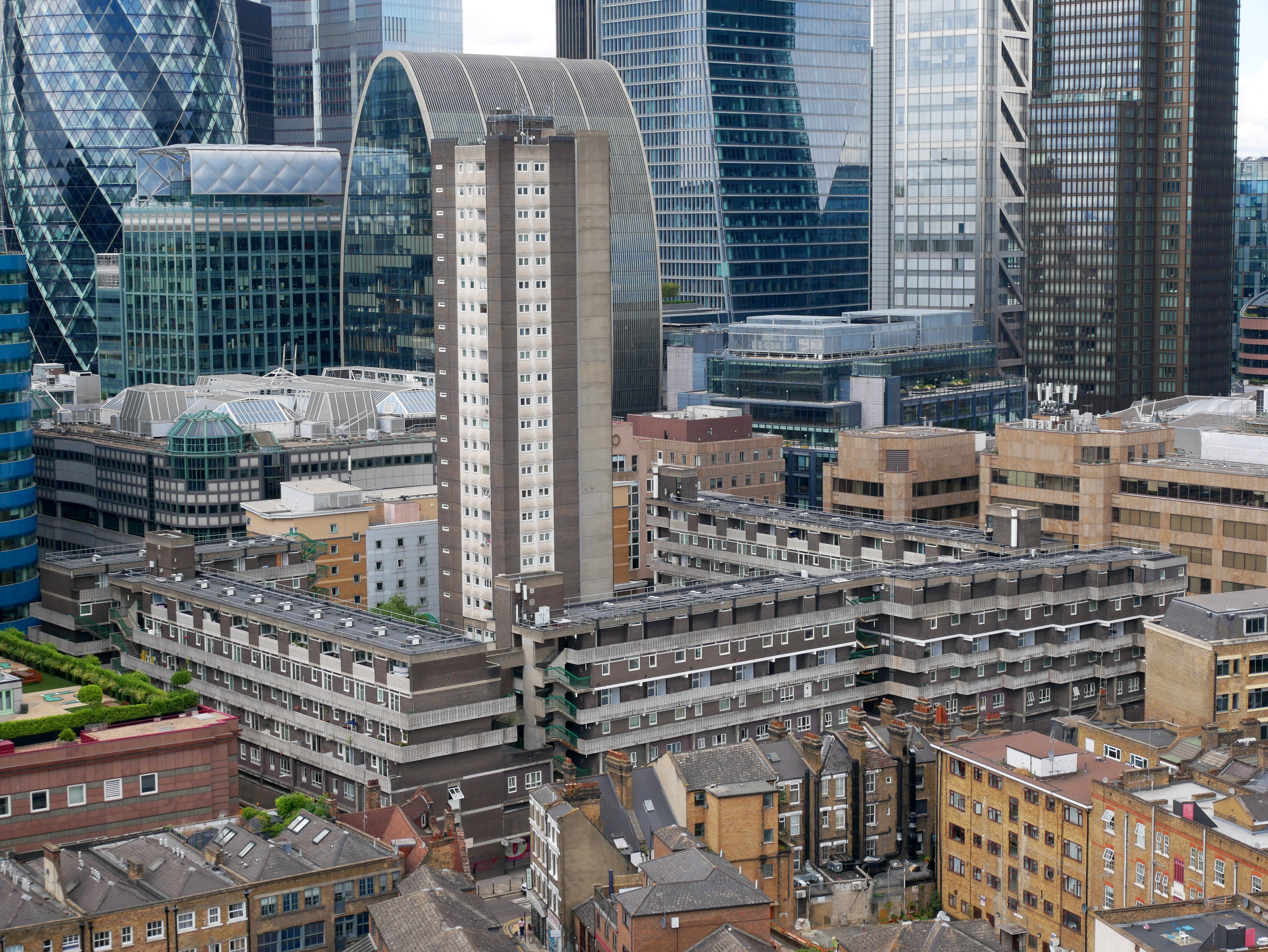
The Middlesex Street Estate as seen from the east

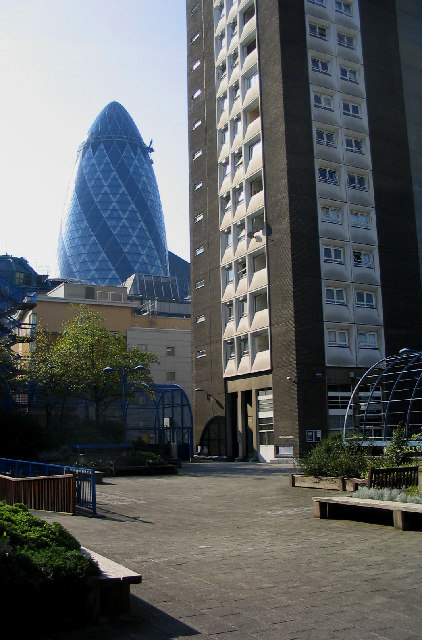
Petticoat Square in 2005

The Middlesex Street Estate is a housing estate in Aldgate, on the east edge of the City of London. It was planned to be connected to other local buildings by an elevated walkway system called the City of London Pedway Scheme.

The estate was built between 1965 and 1970 for the Corporation of London and comprises the 23-storey Petticoat Tower and low-rise buildings around Petticoat Square. The materials are concrete, including slotted concrete for balconies, and engineered brick.

The estate includes 146 low-rise dwellings and the 88 apartments in the tower block.

It was the main filming location for the 2017 Netflix film iBoy.
