= IBoy =

2017 British superhero film

iBoy
- Netflix release poster
- Directed by: Adam Randall
- Screenplay by: Joe Barton
- Story by: Joe Barton; Mark Denton; Jonny Stockwood
- Based on: iBoy by Kevin Brooks
- Produced by: Gail Mutrux; Nate Bolotin; Emily Leo; Oliver Roskill; Lucan Toh
- Starring: Bill Milner; Maisie Williams; Jordan Bolger; Charley Palmer Rothwell; Aymen Hamdouchi; Miranda Richardson; Rory Kinnear
- Cinematography: Eben Bolter
- Edited by: Jesse Parker
- Music by: Max Aruj; Steffen Thum
- Production companies: Netflix; XYZ Films; Wigwam Films; Pretty Pictures
- Distributed by: Vertigo Releasing (United Kingdom); Netflix (Worldwide); XYZ Films (Worldwide)
- Release date: 27 January 2017
- Running time: 90 minutes
- Countries: United Kingdom; United States
- Language: English
- Budget: $1.5 million

iBoy is a 2017 science fiction superhero film distributed by Netflix, starring Bill Milner and Maisie Williams. It is based on the 2010 novel of the same name by Kevin Brooks. It was filmed in and around East-Central London, in particular the Middlesex Street Estate.

== Plot ==
Living in a gang-ridden part of London, 16-year-old Tom Harvey struggles to get by. His best friend Danny gets him a new phone and encourages him to romantically pursue his longtime friend and neighbor Lucy Walker.

Lucy asks Tom to help her study for exams, to which he happily agrees. Arriving at her flat that night, he sees her brother unconscious and a group of masked thugs exiting her room, having raped her and recorded the event. Tom flees and attempts to call the police, but he is shot in the head and rendered unconscious.

Tom awakens days later. His doctor informs him that shrapnel from his phone is embedded in his head. Later that day, he begins to hear phone transmissions and can visualise digital signals. Using his newfound abilities, Tom realises who attacked Lucy. He begins to take revenge on the attackers, one by one.

Meanwhile, Lucy has become a shut-in, and Tom is her only source of hope. They enjoy a meal together outside for the first time since the incident. After a confrontation, Tom's vengeance grows, and he tracks down those who gave the orders to hurt Lucy. He raids their leader's home, damaging his electronics and stealing his cache of cocaine which Tom plants on the attackers before tipping off the police.

Furthering his vigilantism, Tom adopts the alias "iBoy." He texts Lucy that he intends to set things right for her. He posts his acts online and working his way to take out more drugs that are coming in. During another raid, Tom gets trapped by the gang and is beaten severely, barely managing to escape. He stumbles his way home, but passes out in a park on the way, missing his exams and breaking a promise to Lucy.

When Tom goes home, Tom's grandmother is being held at gunpoint and the crime boss known as Ellman demands that Tom gives back the money he stole in exchange for Lucy and his grandmother's safety. He reluctantly agrees and begins to use his powers for both Ellman and to track and help Lucy, who has been kidnapped by those that assaulted her before.

Tom is able to send the police to the kidnapping site, but they don't find anything there as they hide. Lucy gets a gun away from the kidnappers, but is unable to escape before Tom and Ellman arrive. Though Tom's powers were diminished due to his beating, he is able to overload everyone's cell phones to explode, but Ellman threw his away and flees outside.

Tom attempts to subdue Ellman with help from Lucy, but neither is able to do so until Tom unleashes a pulse from his brain, knocking all of them out. He awakens later in the hospital with his grandmother by his side.

Returning home, Tom sees Danny, who had betrayed him to Ellman. Danny tries to repay him with cash for his mistreatment, but he rebuffs him, saying he hadn't taken down the person who recorded Lucy's attack, suggesting it was Danny.

On the roof of their building, Tom meets Lucy, who has made a picnic for the two of them. They share a kiss while looking out to the skyline and with lights in the city showing that the pulse was only temporary and hadn’t removed Tom’s powers at all.

== Cast ==
- Bill Milner as Tom Harvey / iBoy, a teenager who suffers severe head injuries and develops cybernatural powers.
- Maisie Williams as Lucy Walker, Tom's classmate and love interest.
- Miranda Richardson as Wendy "Nan" Harvey, Tom's grandmother.
- Rory Kinnear as Ellman, an evil kingpin who plans to get revenge on Tom's violent and inexplicable powers by manipulating him into robbing The Bank of England.
- Charley Palmer Rothwell as Eugene, a gangster who is a partner of Ellman's.
- Jordan Bolger as Danny, Tom's classmate and best friend.
- Armin Karima as Ant, a gangster from Ellman's group.
- Helen Daniels as Kelly
- Aymen Hamdouchi as Cutz
- McKell David as Hazzard
- Shaquille Ali-Yebuah as Cass
- Leon Annor as Keon
- Lucy Thackeray as Michelle
- Oliver Coopersmith as Ben
- Petrice Jones as Shotgun

== Reception ==
Early reviews of the film were mixed. Review aggregator website Rotten Tomatoes reported that 69% of critics have given the film a positive review based on 13 reviews, with an average rating of 5.60/10. The site's critics consensus reads, "iBoy's original premise and Maisie Williams' strong performance aren't enough to overwrite a clichéd narrative, too-serious tone, and overall glitchy execution." On Metacritic, the film has a weighted average score of 50 out of 100 based on 5 critic reviews, indicating "mixed or average" reviews. The Guardian reviewed it negatively saying, "This could work with humour — but not realist grimness. It's a nice idea which doesn't quite come off."
