= Gail Mutrux =

American film producer (born 1945)

- Born: October 2, 1945 (age 80)
- Occupation: Film producer
- Years active: 1975–present

Gail Mutrux (born October 2, 1945) is an American film producer, best known for her films Donnie Brasco, Nurse Betty, and Kinsey.

Pretty Pictures, Mutrux's company, produces most of her films including the adaptation of The Danish Girl. She started the company with director Neil LaBute in 2001.

== Selected filmography as producer ==
She was a producer in all films unless otherwise noted.

=== Film ===
Year	Film	Credit
1978	Straight Time	Associate producer
1979	Promises in the Dark	Associate producer
1988	Little Nikita	Associate producer
1988	Rain Man	Associate producer
1994	Quiz Show	Co-producer
1997	Donnie Brasco	
1998	A Cool, Dry Place	
2000	Nurse Betty	
2003	The Shape of Things	
2004	Kinsey	
2015	The Danish Girl	
2017	iBoy	
2020	News of the World	

Miscellaneous crew

Year	Film	Role
1975	The Adventure of Sherlock Holmes' Smarter Brother	Assistant: Gene Wilder
1981	True Confessions	Creative associate
1985	Fright Night	Video consultant

Production manager

Year	Film	Role
1976	Nicole	Production manager

Thanks

Year	Film	Role
2009	Amreeka	Thanks
2013	All Is Lost	The producers wish to thank
2020	Four Good Days	The director would like to thank

=== Television ===
Year	Title	Credit	Notes
March 5, 1967 episode	What's My Line?	Herself	Game show
1988	My First Love		Television film
1993−99	Homicide: Life on the Street	Consulting producer	
2015	Show Me a Hero	Executive producer	
2022	Slow Horses	Executive producer	
