= Portsoken =

Ward of the City of London

Coordinates: 51.5144°N 0.0752°W

- Ward
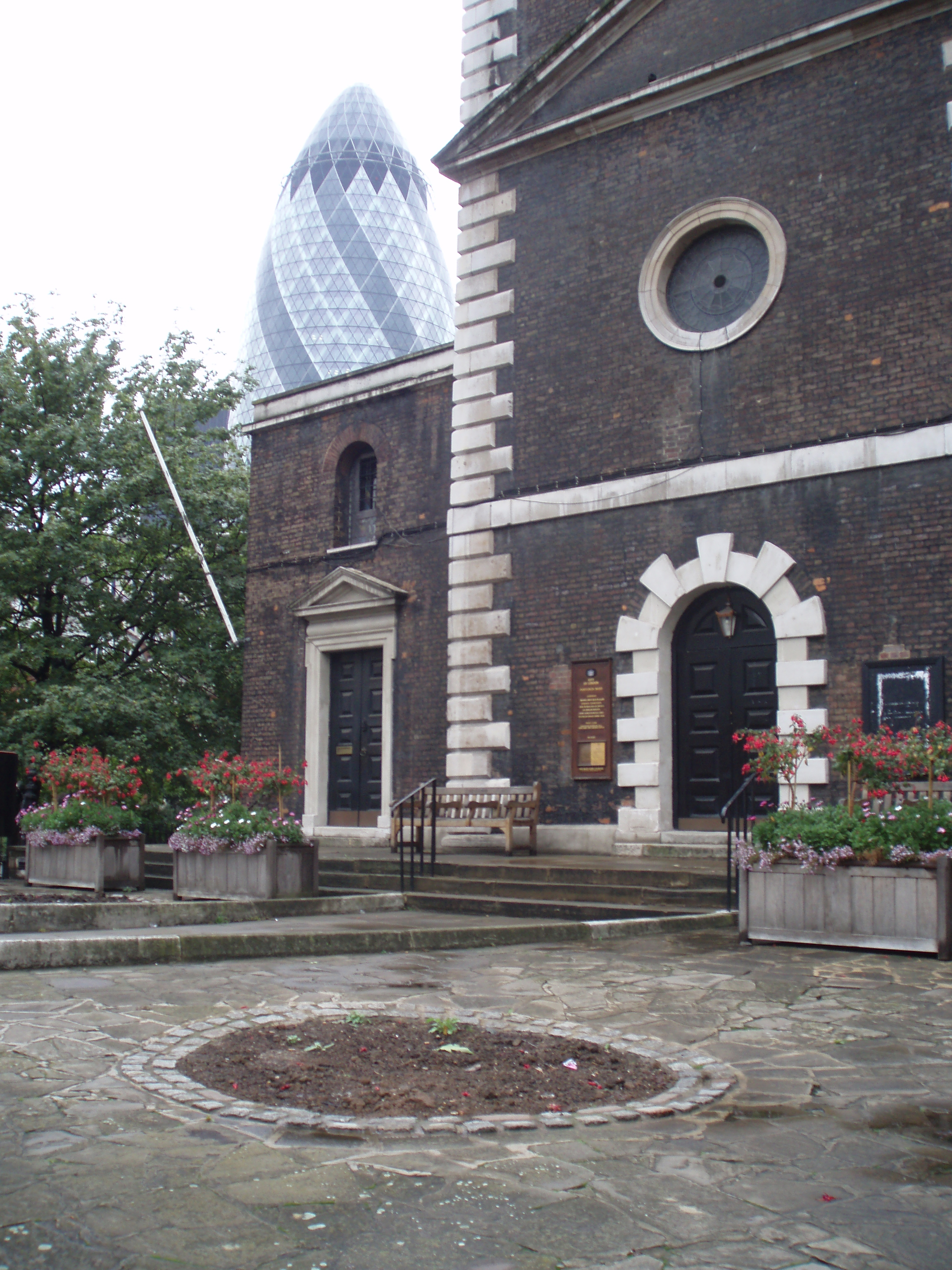
- St Botolph's Aldgate

- Location within Greater London
- Portsoken ward boundaries since 2013
- Population: 985 (2011 Census. Ward)
- Sui generis: City of London
- Administrative area: Greater London
- Region: London
- Country: England
- Sovereign state: United Kingdom
- Post town: LONDON
- Postcode district: E1
- Postcode district: EC3
- Dialling code: 020
- Police: City of London
- Fire: London
- Ambulance: London
- UK Parliament: Cities of London and Westminster
- London Assembly: City and East

Portsoken, traditionally referred to with the definite article as the Portsoken, is one of the City of London, England's 25 ancient wards, which are still used for local elections. Historically an extramural ward, lying east of the former London Wall, the area is sometimes considered to be part of the East End of London. The ward is about 5 hectares in area.

Portsoken contains Aldgate tube station. In everyday speech, the Portsoken ward, which is mainly oriented north–south, is referred to as Aldgate. This applies especially to the central area where the A11 road becomes known as Aldgate High Street as it passes through the ward.

== History ==
John Stow's Survey of London records that the "soke" – in this context the right to extract fines as a source of income – (later "liberty") was granted in the time of Saxon king Edgar the Peaceful, east of Aldgate to a guild of knights, the Cnichtengild, in exchange, essentially, for regular jousting. Norman kings confirmed these rights but later the land was voluntarily transferred to the Priory of the Holy Trinity by the descendants of the guild.

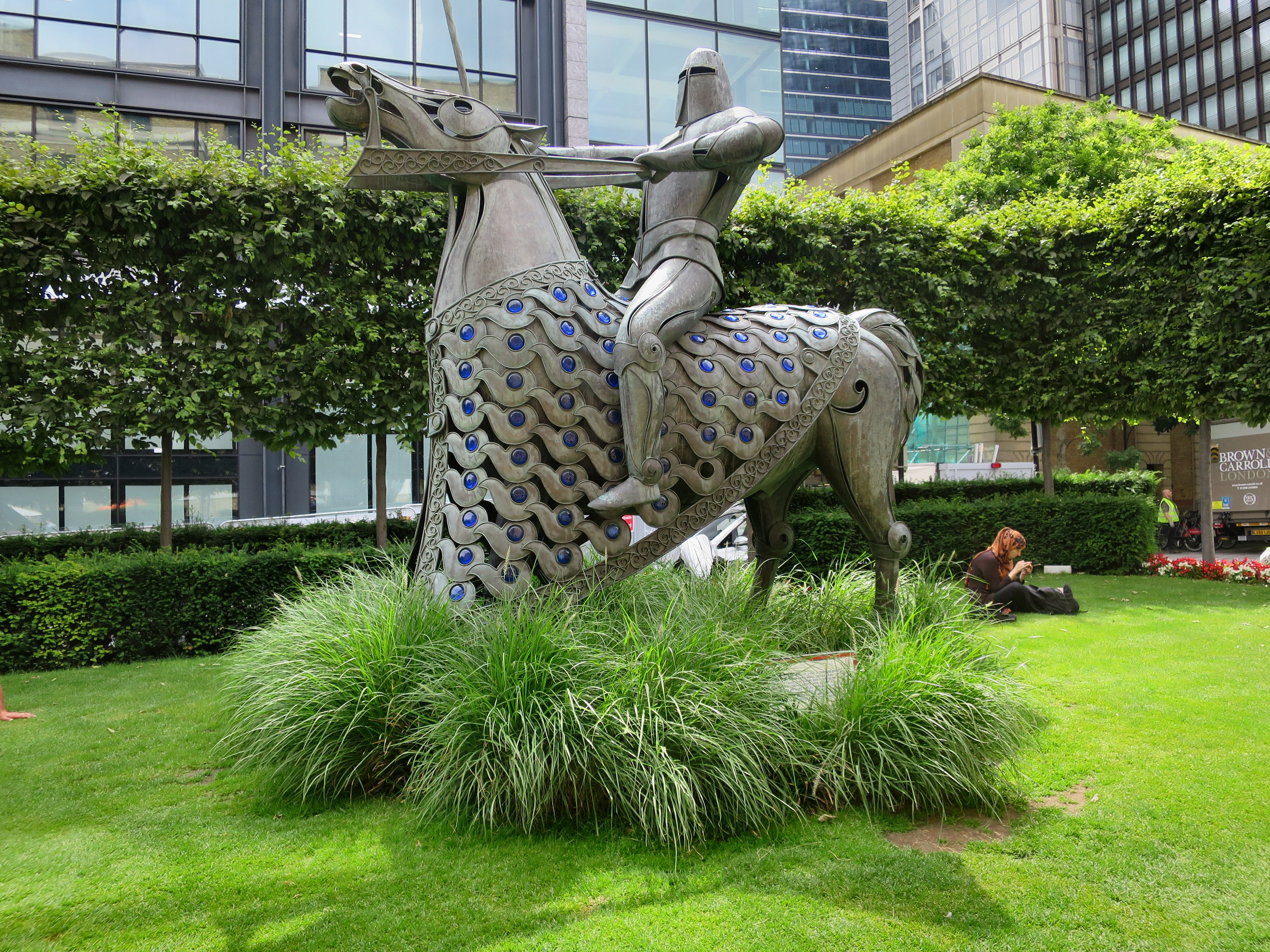
The Devonshire Square statue, on the Ward boundary with Bishopsgate Without, commemorates the Cnichtengild

In 1120 or 1121 (the exact date is unknown), the Portsoken was granted as a liberty to the Holy Trinity Priory, which had been founded in 1107 by Queen Matilda, the wife of King Henry I. The sitting prior of Holy Trinity became, ex officio, an alderman of the City of London Corporation representing the Portsoken ward, and remained so until the dissolution of the monasteries by King Henry VIII in 1531.

The Ward was originally coterminous with the once slightly larger parish of St Botolph without Aldgate and extended as far south as the Thames. However, the growth of the Tower of London beyond the line of the London Wall, disputes with the Tower, the creation of the Tower Liberty other factors resulted in the southern area being lost to the ward and to the City of London, after around 1200.

The area taken for the Tower Liberty was lost to both the city ward of Portsoken and to the parish, while East Smithfield was lost to the Portsoken but remained a part of the parish. In 1442, St Katharine's (first established in 1147) became an independent Precinct, the Precinct of St Katharine by the Tower and so ceased to be a part of the East Smithfield area of the parish.

=== People ===
In 1332, a tax assessment showed 23 taxpayers in the Portsoken. However, this figure only included freemen of the City of London who possessed moveable property worth more than 10 shillings, and so did not include the poor, non-citizens, or members of religious orders. A later subsidy roll from 1582 showed that the ward's taxpayers had been assessed to pay a total of 57 pounds, 11 shillings and 4 pence.

The Portsoken has long had a mixed population, and in 1483 is recorded as having more aliens in its population than any ward in the City of London.

This pattern of diversity continued, during the late 16th and early 17th centuries the parish of St Botolph without Aldgate as a whole (both the Portsoken and East Smithfield parts) is recorded as having a population of at least 25 people identified as "blackamoors."

They appear to have arrived as a result of the war with Spain, being freed from Spanish slave ships, or slavery in Spanish colonies, by English warships. These free black Londoners, some of whom had mixed African and Spanish ancestry, often found work as sailors or interpreters. Many were servants and one appears to have worked at the Whitechapel Bell Foundry. The parish records from that time also reveal the presence of French, Dutch and Indian residents as well as at least one Persian and one East Indian (Bengali).

Since the 1840s, nearly all of the Aldermen of the Ward have been Jewish.

== Geography ==
Portsoken contains Aldgate tube station.

=== Boundary changes ===
Portsoken ward boundaries from 2003 to 2013

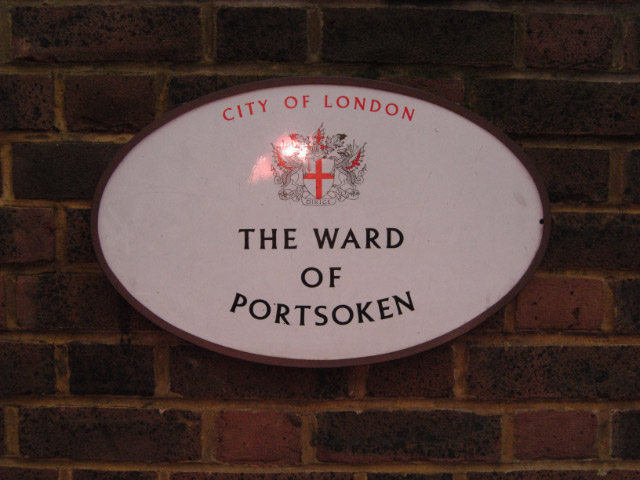
Street sign

Boundary changes in 1994 and 2013 made often fundamental changes to the ancient Wards. The Portsoken (part of the City of London) and the neighbouring London Borough of Tower Hamlets exchanged territory, with the Middlesex Street Estate being transferred to the Portsoken.

Land was also exchanged with the Aldgate Ward (Aldgate was formerly entirely within the wall, with the Portsoken entirely without), so that John Cass's Foundation Primary School (now The Aldgate School) is now part of the ward, despite lying just inside the line of the wall.

The Portsoken is now regarded as one of the city's four residential wards, with a population of 985 (2011).

== Politics ==
Historic extent of the Portsoken, and other City Wards

Ward boundaries between 2003 and 2013

Portsoken is one of 25 wards in the City of London, each electing an alderman to the Court of Aldermen, and commoners (the city equivalent of a councillor) to the Court of Common Council of the City of London Corporation. Only electors who are Freemen of the city are eligible to stand for election.

Keith Joseph, Secretary of State for Industry 1979–1981 and Secretary of State for Education and Science 1981–1986, took the area as his territorial designation on elevation to the Lords in 1987. Similarly, Peter Levene (Lord Mayor 1998–1999) in 1997. Joseph's father was Lord Mayor in 1942–1943.

In 2014 William Campbell-Taylor made history when he became the first ever party politician to win a seat on the City of London's Common Council, standing as a Labour candidate in a by-election in the ward of Portsoken. William Campbell-Taylor stood down as a Common Councilman in March 2017 at the end of his time in office.

In the 2017 City-wide Common Council elections, the Labour Party won two seats in Portsoken ward with local residents Jason Pritchard and Munsur Ali topping the polls and Independent incumbents John Fletcher and Henry Jones elected in third and fourth place respectively. The Labour Party won a record total of five seats on the Common Council in March 2017, winning two seats in Portsoken, two seats in Cripplegate ward and one seat in Aldersgate ward.

In December 2017, William Campbell-Taylor stood as the first ever party political candidate to contest a City of London Aldermanic election, standing for Labour in Portsoken ward, but was defeated by Independent candidate Prem Goyal. Prem Goyal is the founder of the UK political party, All People's Party, although to date Goyal has chosen to stand as an Independent in elections in the City of London.

== See also ==
- East End of London
