= Armin Karima =

British actor

Armin Karima is a British-Iranian actor. He is known for his roles as Abdul Bukhari in the BBC series Waterloo Road (2015), Ant in the film iBoy (2017), Kasim Al-Yazbek in the FOX series Tyrant (2016), and Malek Amir in the Netflix series Sex Education (2019).

== Early life ==
Karima attended City and Islington College. He trained at Identity School of Acting.

== Career ==
While training, Karima booked his first role in the short film TAG for BBC IPlayer. Just before his last college performance, Karima landed a regular role in the tenth and final series of the BBC school drama Waterloo Road as Abdul Bukhari. Karima was then cast alongside Shahab Hosseini in the feature film Gholem in 2015.

In 2016, Karima appeared in the second season of the Fox series Tyrant as Kasim Al-Yazbek and landed a role in the BBC series Moving on. In 2017, Karima played Ant in the Netflix film iBoy. Shortly after he landed a role in Fearless for ITV.

== Filmography ==
=== Film ===
Year	Title	Role	Notes
2014	Tag	Deks	Short film
2017	iBoy	Ant	
2017	Gholam	Arash	
2020	Home from Home	Samir	Short film
2022	Bahar	Navid	Short film

=== Television ===
Year	Title	Role	Notes
2014	Babylon	Youth	Episode: "Victoria Park"
2015	Waterloo Road	Abdul Bukhari	Recurring role; 9 episodes
2015	Tyrant	Kasim Al-Yazbek	Recurring role; 7 episodes
2016	Moving On	Safi	Episode: "Eighteen"
2017	Fearless	Imran	Recurring role; 3 episodes
2017	The State	Abu Muharib	Miniseries; 1 episode
2017	Black Mirror	Farshad	Episode: "Crocodile"
2018	Doctors	Michael Leonard	Episode: "Helpless"
2018	Press	Adnan Homsi	Episode: "Two Worlds"
2020–2021	Sex Education	Malek Amir	Recurring role; 4 episodes
2021	Intergalactic	Evan Vikri	Episode: "Episode 1"
2021	The Girlfriend Experience	Hiram	Recurring role; 8 episodes
2023	Vigil	Nader Waheed	Episode: "Series 2, Episode 3"
2025	Prisoner 951	Seyed	Recurring role; 5 episodes
