= Peter of Cornwall =

Peter of Cornwall (1139/1140– July 7, 1221) was a medieval scholar and prior of Holy Trinity Priory.

He was born near Launceston, Cornwall, the son of Jordan of Trecarrel (died c. 1180), provost of Launceston. The identity of his mother is unknown, but she was perhaps sister-in-law to Reginald de Dunstanville, earl of Cornwall. His uncles Bernard and Nicholas were scribes to Henry I.

Peter studied in London under Master Henry of Northampton, a canon of St Paul's. He was received as an Augustinian canon sometime after 1170 at Holy Trinity, Aldgate. His first work was inspired by a synod in London where he heard the bishop of London, Gilbert Foliot, preach. This was the Pantheologus, a collection of biblical material assembled as a sourcebook for preachers, which he finally completed in 1189.

He became prior of Holy Trinity in 1197 and remained in office until his death on 7 July 1221. In 1210 Peter was one of two intermediaries between King John of England and Stephen Langton, Archbishop of Canterbury, during a series of negotiations which failed to achieve an end to the interdict. Peter dedicated his Liber disputationum contra Symonem Iudeum to the exiled Stephen Langton.

Peter also compiled the Liber revelationum (Lambeth Palace Library, MS 51). This is a vast collection of visions relating to the next world, compiled between the years 1200 and 1206. The work includes several personal stories which provide much evidence for Peter's life and career, including the "Visions of Ailsi," Peter's grandfather. It also includes two important otherworld visions relating to St. Patrick's Purgatory, the well-known Tractatus de Purgatorio Sancti Patricii, which is provisionally dated to between 1135 and 1154, and another work related directly to Peter by a monk from Mellifont Abbey, who heard second-hand of this other vision, which took place c. 1170.

Peter was buried in the chapel of the Blessed Virgin at Holy Trinity Priory. The priory was dissolved in 1532, and nothing of the buildings survive other than a few arches in an office building on the site.

== External references ==
- Lambeth Palace Library MS 51
