= Femi Oguns =

British actor (born 1977)

Femi Oguns MBE
- Olufemi Temitope Ogunsanwo, was a former actor
- Born: Olufemi Temitope Ogunsanwo; 28 October 1977 (age 48); Paddington, London, England
- Occupations: CEO of Identity Agency Group & Identity School of Acting

Olufemi Temitope Ogunsanwo MBE (born 28 October 1977), known as Femi Oguns, is a British agent and former actor who founded the Identity School of Acting and Identity Agency Group.

== Background ==
Femi Oguns obtained a joint honours degree in Race and Culture and Performing Arts at university, after previously attending drama school. It was here he drew on personal experience and longed to create a drama school that would give actors of all ethnicities the platform to express themselves to their fullest, and so founded the Identity School of Acting in October 2003.

Oguns' achievements have led to a series of high-profile commendations; in 2010 he was named as a UK Film Council Breakthrough Brit in the fields of Acting and Writing. In 2014, Oguns was appointed Member of the Order of the British Empire (MBE) for his services to the acting industry, and in 2017 he was the first agent in the UK to be awarded with a special jury prize by the British Independent Film Award (BIFA) for his contribution to the British film industry. He has also been named on Powerful Media's Powerlist of the top 100 most influential figures of African/Caribbean descent, having made the top 100 in both the 2020 and 2021 editions.

== Early career ==
As an actor, Oguns has featured in a number of dramas in both television and film. His credits include: Strange (BBC), Take my Heart Dogma (Channel 4), Prime Suspect (ITV), feature film Last Chance Harvey opposite Dustin Hoffman, and Ron Howard's The Good Lie with Reese Witherspoon.

Oguns has also worked as a writer, his debut play Torn received the MSVA Award for Best Stage Production 2008. Torn included Wil Johnson, Kéllé Bryan, Antonia Okonma, Richard Hollis, Michelle Asante, and Brooke Kinsella.

== Identity School and Agency ==
Identity School of Acting was founded by Oguns and provides acting training, specialising in minority actors. Founded in 2006, Identity Agency Group (IAG) is an acting agency.

In 2011, IAG US division was formed, merging with some of the top agencies and management companies in the United States, representing clients both in the UK and North America. IAG Los Angeles and has worked in partnership with WME, UTA, Gersh, and ICM.

Some of IAG's clients include:

- John Boyega
- Malachi Kirby
- Letitia Wright (BAFTA Breakthrough Brit)
- Melanie Liburd
- Charlie Covell (BAFTA Breakthrough Brit)
- Cecilia Noble(Laurence Olivier Award nominated)
- Alexis Rodney
