= Holy Trinity Priory =

Monastery for Augustinian canons in medieval London

Coordinates: 51.5136°N 0.0780°W

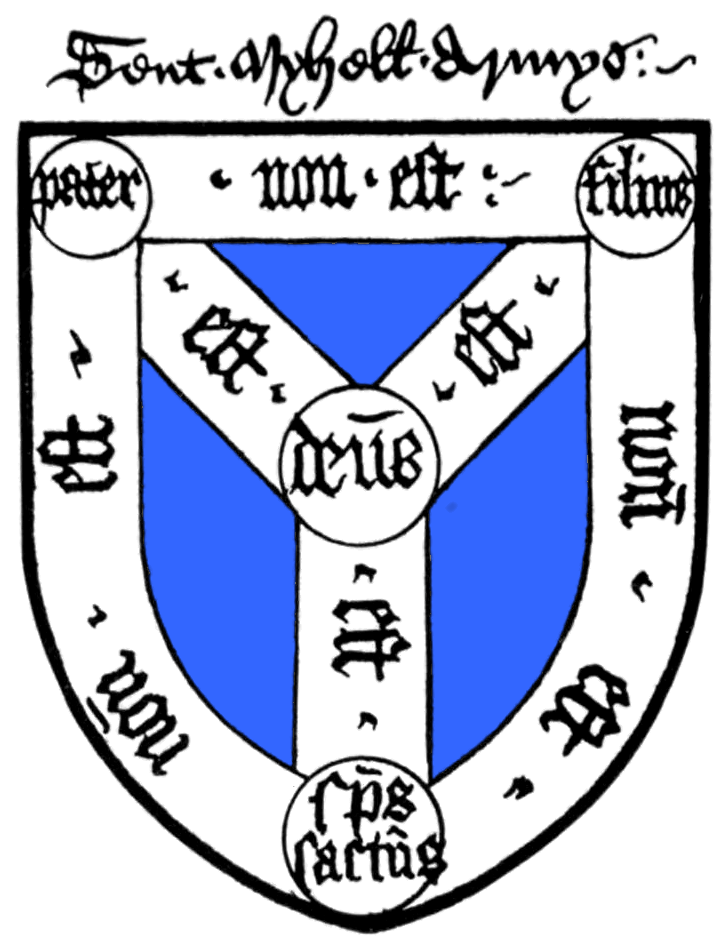
15th-century heraldic version of the Shield of the Trinity diagram; the monastery's coat of arms would have closely resembled this.

The Holy Trinity Priory, also known as Christchurch Aldgate, was a priory of Austin canons (Black Canons) founded around 1108 by the English queen Matilda of Scotland near Aldgate in London.

== History ==
The English queen Matilda of Scotland received advice and help in the foundation from Anselm of Canterbury, the archbishop of Canterbury. The house was founded with clergy from St Botolph's Priory in Colchester, and the first prior was Norman, who was the queen's confessor. By 1115 the entire soke, or liberty of East Smithfield (including the ward of Portsoken) was given by the Knighten Guilde to the church of Holy Trinity within Aldgate. The prior of the abbey was then to sit as an ex officio Alderman of London.

Matilda of Boulogne continued the close relationship between queenship and the priory. Two of her children were buried here and she took the prior as her confessor. In the 12th century the priory had a reputation as a centre of learning under Prior Peter of Cornwall.

Holy Trinity Priory in London, commended to St Botolph's Priory by Matilda of Scotland, was initially supposed to be obedient to them. However this authority was disputed by Holy Trinity, and after a lawsuit before arbitrators appointed by Pope Honorius III the matter was referred to the bishop of London, who decided in 1223 that Holy Trinity should be free from visitation from the canons and priors of St Botolph's. Thomas Pomerey is named as the prior of the house & church of Holy Trinity within Algate, in 1460.

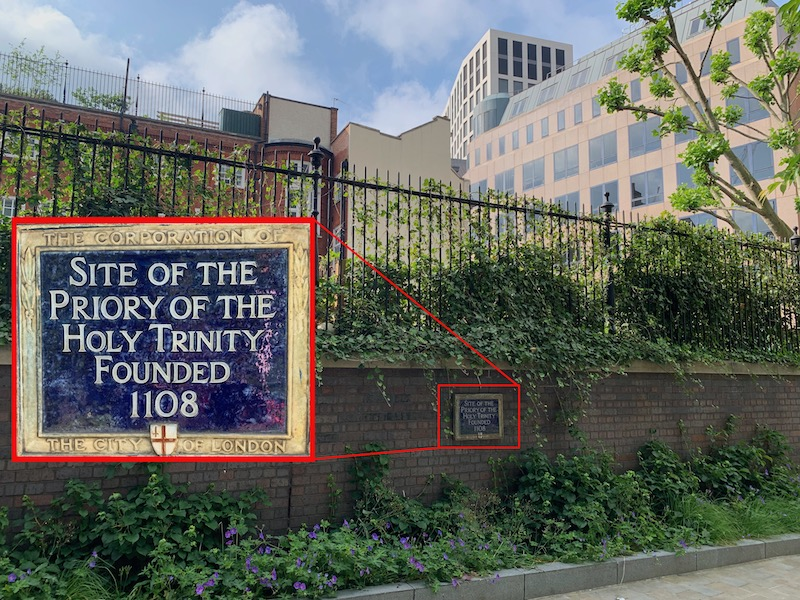
A blue plaque for the Holy Trinity Priory in St James’ Passage

The priory was dissolved in February 1532 when it was given back to King Henry VIII. In 1544, the priory came onto Thomas Duke of Norfolk, and was from then called The Duke's Place. It was sold to "the Lord Mayor, the commonalty and the citizens of London" in 1592. The Great Synagogue was built in the area of The Duke's Place in 1791.

The buildings and land associated with the priory were given, or sold, to prominent courtiers and City merchants. In 1846, it was reported that there remained scarcely anything of the priory. None of the buildings survive today except for some pointed arches within the office building on the corner of Aldgate and Mitre Street. Mitre Street itself follows roughly the line of the nave of the priory church, while Mitre Square corresponds roughly to the former cloister.

Some account of the Priory is given by John Stow, and in the revised Monasticon.

== Burials ==
- Baldwin (died in or before 1135) and Matilda (died before 1141), children of King Stephen and Queen Matilda
- Rohese of Boulogne, wife of Richard de Luci
- Henry Fitz-Ailwin (d. 1212). First Lord Mayor of London. Buried in the entrance to the chapter-house.
- Geoffrey FitzGeoffrey de Mandeville, 2nd Earl of Essex
- Lady Margaret Tibetot Scrope, wife of Roger Scrope, 2nd Baron Scrope of Bolton
- Agnes (d. 12 June 1403), daughter of Michael de Poynings, 1st Baron Poynings

== Priors ==
The priors of this house include:

- Norman d. 1147- a disciple of Anselm of Canterbury
- Ralph d. 1167
- William
- Peter of Cornwall (Prior 1197–1221)
- Richard de Temple
- John de Toking
- Eustace prior from 1264 to 1280
- William Aygnel
- John Sevenoke (accused of lechery in 1439)
- Nicholas Hancocke

== Sources ==
- Burton, Janet (1994). Monastic and Religious Orders in Britain: 1000–1300. Cambridge Medieval Textbooks. Cambridge UK: Cambridge University Press. ISBN 0-521-37797-8.
- Duggan, Anne (1997). Queens and Queenship in Medieval Europe: Proceedings of a Conference Held at King's College London, April 1995. The Boydell Press.
