= St Botolph Without Aldgate =

Ancient parish in London

St Botolph Without Aldgate St Botolph Aldgate
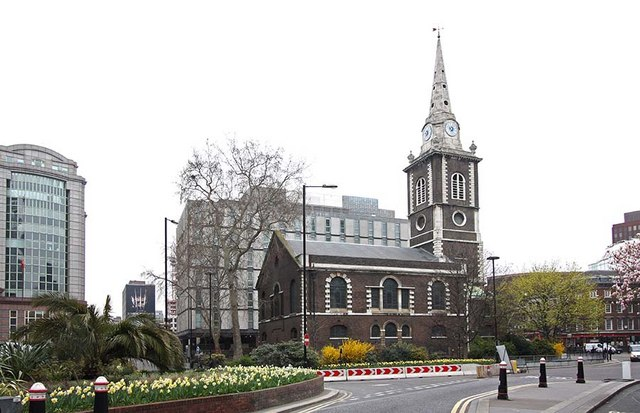
- The church of St Botolph's, Aldgate was in the City of London section of the parish

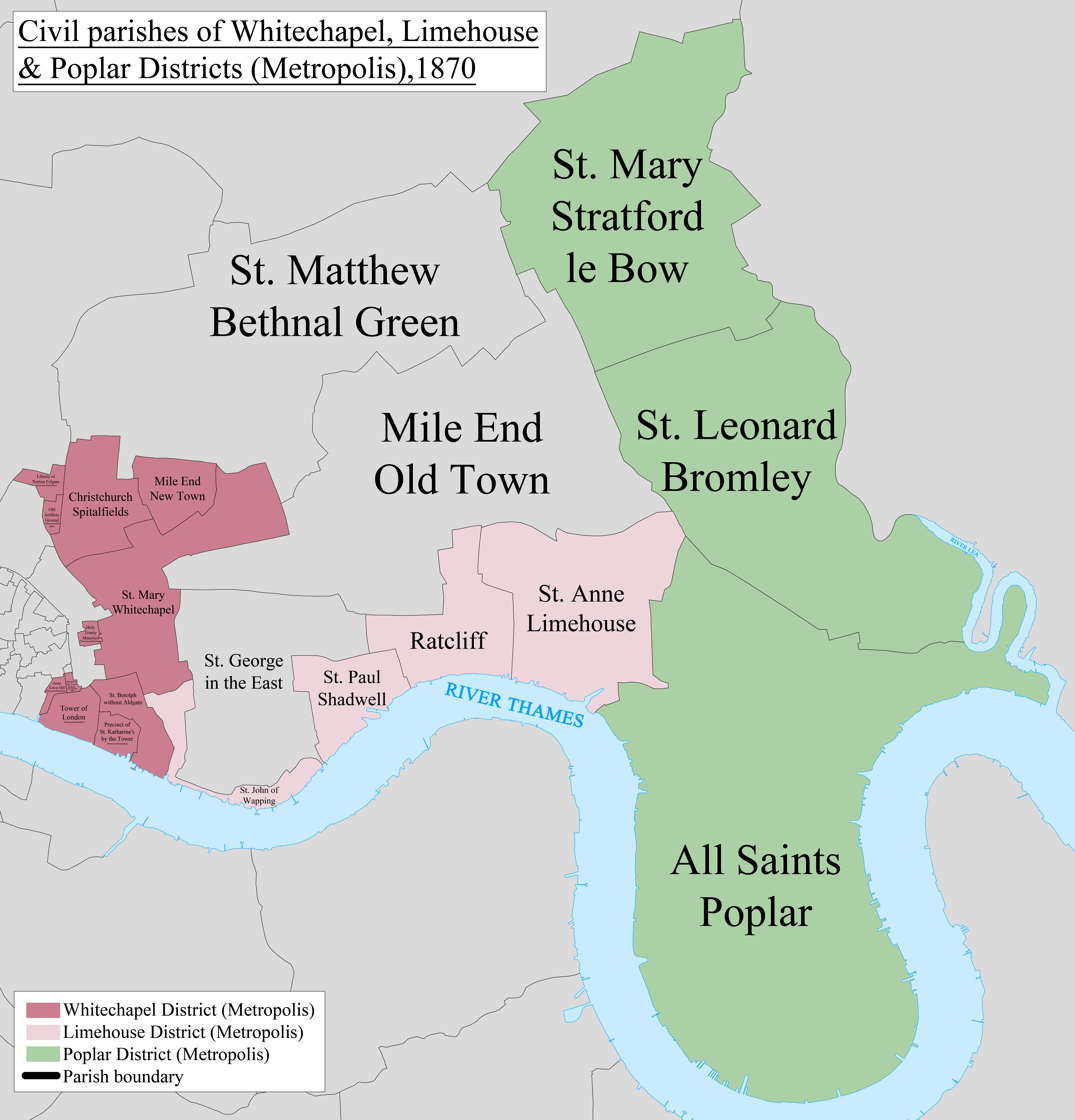
- St Botolph Without Aldgate civil parish, one of the parishes in the 1870s Whitechapel District (red)
- Area
  - 1851: 37 acres
  - 1911: 75 acres
  - Coordinates: 51.514°N 0.076°W
- Area transferred
  - 1895: All from St Katharine's by the Tower
  - 1895: All from Old Tower Without
- 1901: All from Tower of London
- Population
  - 1801: 6,153
  - 1851: 4,163
  - 1911: 3,245
- Density
  - 1851: 111.78/acre
  - 1911: 43.27/acre
- Status: Civil parish

St Botolph Without Aldgate was an ancient parish immediately east of and outside (without) Aldgate, a gate in London's defensive wall. The parish church was St Botolph's Aldgate.

The densely populated, and entirely extramural East End parish was split into two parts: the Portsoken ward of the City of London and East Smithfield in the County of Middlesex. Each part operated as a separate parish for civil administration with its own local government, but it was a single parish for ecclesiastical purposes.

== Within the City ==
The section of the parish in the City of London was the Portsoken ward.

The City of London section of the parish was abolished in 1907 when the City of London civil parish was created.

== Outside the City ==
The part in Middlesex was known as East Smithfield. It was part of the Tower division (which was also known as the Tower Hamlets). Its eastern boundary with Wapping ran along Thomas More Street (originally known as Nightingale Lane) and the small brook that ran either side of it.

Civil parish administration was in the hands of the vestry until 1855 when the parish was grouped into the Whitechapel District and the parish elected six members to Whitechapel District Board of Works. The parish was transferred from the County of Middlesex to the County of London in 1889.

In 1895 it absorbed the civil parishes of St Katherine by the Tower and Old Tower Without. In 1901 it absorbed the civil parish of the Tower of London.

It became part of the Metropolitan Borough of Stepney in 1900 and the local authority became Stepney Borough Council. The civil parish then had only nominal existence until 1921 when it was abolished.

== Demographics ==
In common with the neighbouring St Katharine's Precinct (a part of the parish until 1444), the parish has had a diverse population since the medieval period.

From 1236, the parish (or at least the south of it) had a Jewish population, settled in the area for the protection of the Tower and its garrison. The Jews had to take refuge in the Tower several times and on at least one of those occasions, in 1267, during the Second Barons' War, formed part of its defensive garrison during a siege. This arrangement lasted until the expulsion of the Jews from England in 1290.

In 1483 the Portsoken ward is recorded as having more aliens in its population than any ward in the City of London.

This pattern of diversity continued, during the late 16th and early 17th centuries the parish as a whole is recorded as having a population of at least 25 people identified as "blackamoors."

They appear to have arrived as a result of the war with Spain, being freed from Spanish slave ships, or slavery in Spanish colonies, by English warships. These free black Londoners, some of whom had mixed African and Spanish ancestry, often found work as sailors or interpreters. Many were servants and one appears to have worked at the Whitechapel Bell Foundry. The parish records from that time also reveal the presence of French, Dutch and Indian residents as well as at least one Persian and one East Indian (Bengali).

The continuation of the black presence is illustrated from a court record from 1787, which noted that constables trying to make an arrest at the Shovel public house in East Smithfield, were ejected by the landlord and more than forty black drinkers.

Since the 1840s, nearly all of the Aldermen of the Portsoken electoral ward have been Jewish.
