= Aldgate =

Coordinates: 51.5132°N 0.0777°W

- Ward
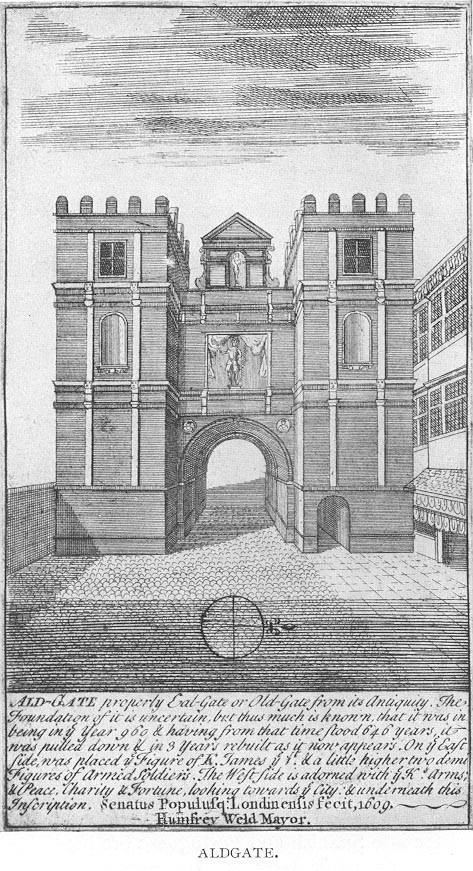
- Print of the Aldgate, around 1609

- Location within Greater London
- Aldgate ward boundaries since 2013
- OS grid reference: TQ334813
  - Charing Cross: 2.3 mi (3.7 km) WSW
- Sui generis: City of London
- Administrative area: Greater London
- Region: London
- Country: England
- Sovereign state: United Kingdom
- Post town: LONDON
- Postcode district: EC3
- Postcode district: E1
- Dialling code: 020
- Police: City of London
- Fire: London
- Ambulance: London
- UK Parliament: Cities of London and Westminster
- London Assembly: City and East

Aldgate (/ˈɔːlɡeɪt/) was a gate in the former defensive wall around the City of London. The gate gave its name to Aldgate High Street, the first stretch of the A11 road, that takes that name as it passes through the ancient, extramural Portsoken Ward of the City of London. There is an ancient Aldgate Ward inside the line of the former gate and wall, and a similarly ancient Portsoken Ward that lies just outside of it. Aldgate High Street is 2.3 miles (3.7 km) east of Charing Cross.

== Etymology ==
The etymology of the name "Aldgate" is uncertain. It is first recorded in 1052 as Æst geat ("east gate") but had become Alegate by 1108. Writing in the 16th century, John Stow derived the name from "Old Gate" (Aeld Gate). However, Henry Harben, writing in 1918, contended that this was wrong and that documents show that the "d" is missing in documents written before 1486–87. Alternative meanings include "Ale Gate" in connection with a putative ale-house or "All Gate" meaning the gate was free to all. Other possibilities canvassed by Harben include reference to a Saxon named "Ealh," or reference to foreigners ("el") or oil ("ele") or "awl". Gillian Bebbington, writing in 1972, suggests Alegate, Aelgate ("public gate") or Aeldgate ("Old Gate") as equally viable alternatives, while Weinreb and Hibbert, writing in 1983, revert to Stow's theory that the name means "Old Gate".

== The gate ==
It is thought that a gate at Aldgate spanned the road to Colchester in the Roman period, when London Wall was constructed. The gateway – which probably had two circular towers – stood at the corner of the modern Duke's Place, on the east side of the city, with a busy thoroughfare passing through it.

The gate was rebuilt between 1108 and 1147, again in 1215, and reconstructed completely between 1607 and 1609 "in a more classical and less functional style". Like London's other gates, Aldgate was "fortified with porticullises and chained" in 1377 due to concerns about potential attacks by the French.

Aldgate's defensive functions are known to have been tested twice. Firstly during the Great Rising in the summer of 1381 when thousands of insurgents from the surrounding region, assisted by sympathisers within and without, entered the City through Aldgate, unopposed. The second breach was during the Siege of London, in the spring of 1471, when troops led by the Bastard of Fauconberg forced the gate, but were penned in and defeated in the small open space inside the gate.

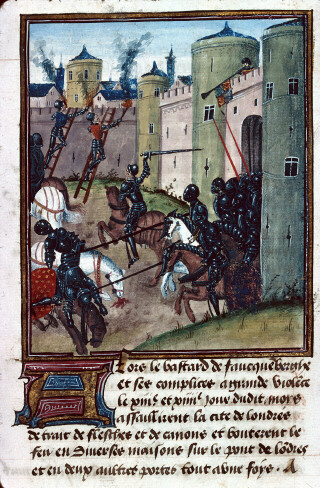
Yorkist defenders sally from Aldgate, 1471

It has been argued that Aldgate's defenders deliberately allowed the vanguard of Fauconberg's men to through the gate in order that the portcullis could be lowered behind them; allowing the defenders to trap and defeat in detail that proportion of the attackers.

While he was a customs official, from 1374 until 1386 - including the period of the Great Rising, Geoffrey Chaucer occupied apartments above the gate, where he wrote some of his poems. London's aldermen had first conceived of renting unneeded space over the City gates earlier in the century. Although keenly sought after due to their location, the rooms "were built for military occupancy and remained rough-hewn [and] nonprivate". Chaucer likely occupied the single tower on the south end of the gate. A 1585 sketch of Aldgate's north tower reveals an interior room of approximately 16 by 14 foot (4.9 by 4.3 m); its southern sibling probably had similar dimensions. The space would have been "cramped, cold, rudimentary in its sanitary arrangements, and (perhaps most seriously in the case of a writer) ill lit, even at midday".

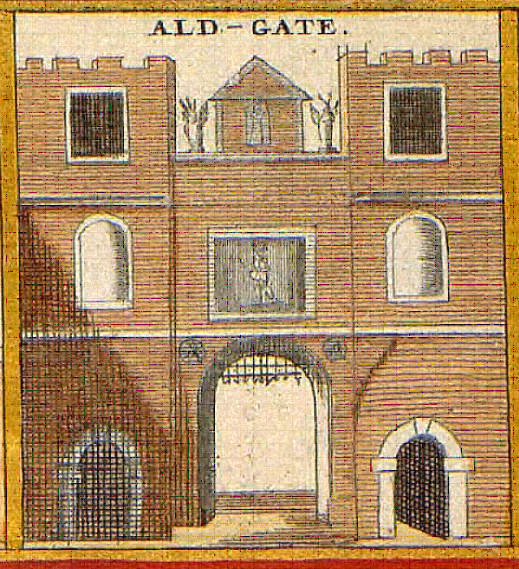
The Aldgate, around 1690

In his Survey of London (1598), John Stow wrote that Aldgate "hath had two pair of gates, though now but one; the hooks remaineth yet. Also there hath been two portcullisses; the one of them remaineth, the other wanteth, but the place of letting down is manifest".

The gate was removed in 1761 in order to improve traffic flow. The historical and cultural significance of the gate led local antiquarian Ebenezer Mussell to buy the gates stones (or some of them) and also the reliefs. The materials were used to extend his home at Bethnal Green. The reliefs were prominently displayed and the house renamed Aldgate House. The house was in turn cleared to make way for development between 1807 and 1811. The site, on what is now known as Victoria Park Square has since been redeveloped again, and is now the site of the 'Church of our Lady of the Assumption'.

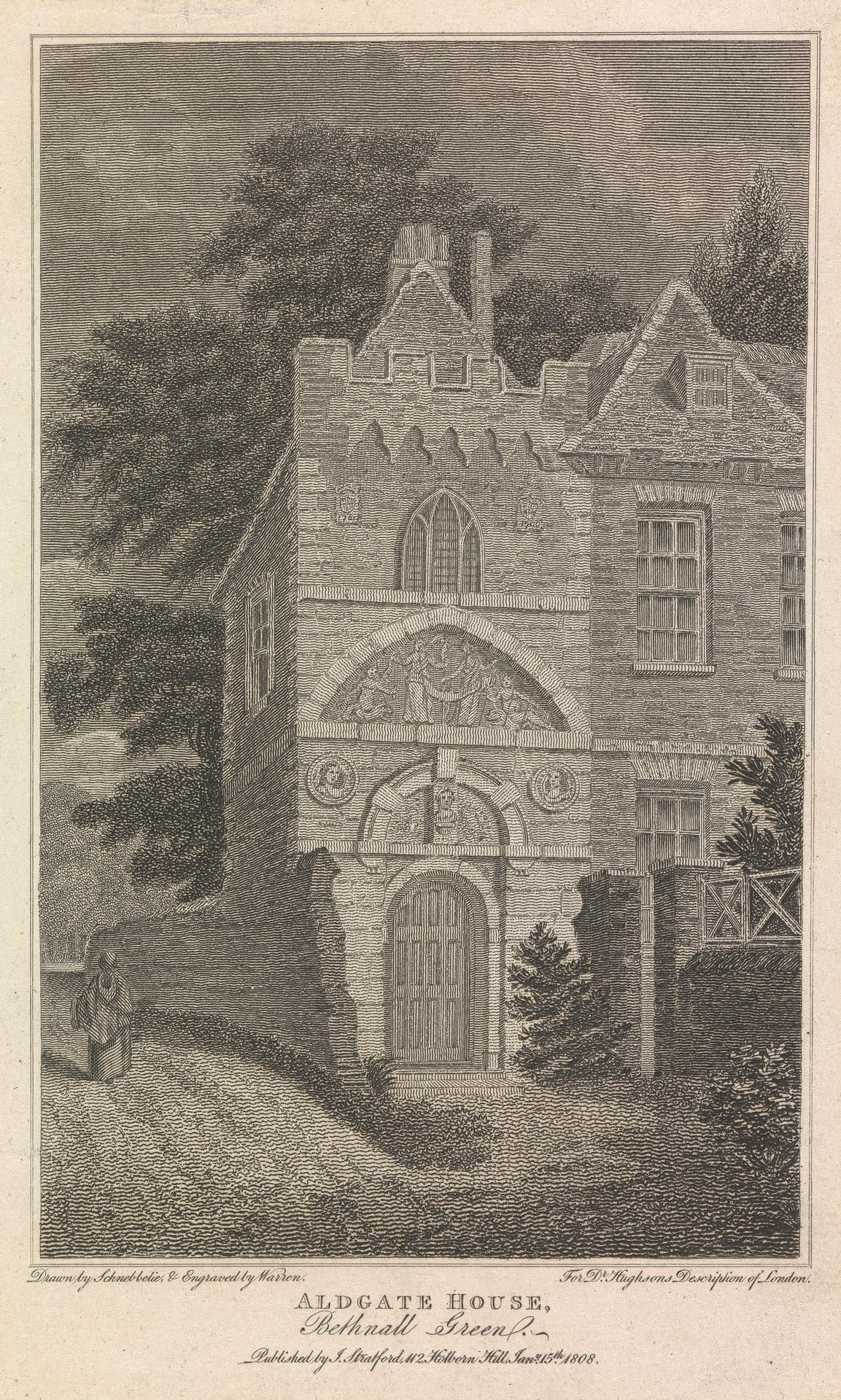
Aldgate House, Bethnal Green, around 1808

== Aldgate locality ==
=== Geography ===
The originally Roman A11 Road, once known as the Great Essex Road, is known as Aldgate High Street as it passes through the Portsoken Ward, and the use of Aldgate as a place name typically applies to this extramural area around Aldgate High Street. The High Street is around 290 metres (950 feet) long. Due to the road geography, and its historic interest, the Aldgate Pump, a few metres inside the position of the former gate is also usually included.

Immediately east of Aldgate High Street the road becomes known as Whitechapel High Street as it enters the Whitechapel area of the London Borough of Tower Hamlets. The stretch of Whitechapel High Street extending as far as Gardiners Corner, and including Aldgate East tube station is also occasionally referred to as part of Aldgate.

=== History ===
The church of St Botolph's Aldgate stands just outside the position of the former gate, and was in place by 1115, though some traditions suggest an earlier origin.

In about 1420 the Whitechapel Bell Foundry was founded in Aldgate, but it later moved to nearby Whitechapel. The foundry continued to supply bells to churches in the city, including the rebuilt church of St Botolph without Aldgate in 1744.

During the late 16th-century, an immigrant from Antwerp named Jacob Jansen (d. 1593) established a pottery producing English Delftware at Aldgate.

A Jewish community developed in the area after Oliver Cromwell invited the Jews to return to England. They established London's oldest synagogue at Bevis Marks in 1698,

In 1773 Poems on Various Subjects, Religious and Moral by Phillis Wheatley, the first book by an African American was published in Aldgate after her owners could not find a publisher in Boston, Massachusetts.

Daniel Mendoza was born in 1764 to a Jewish family in Aldgate. He was author of The Art of Boxing and became an English boxing champion from 1792 to 1795.

=== Aldgate Pump ===
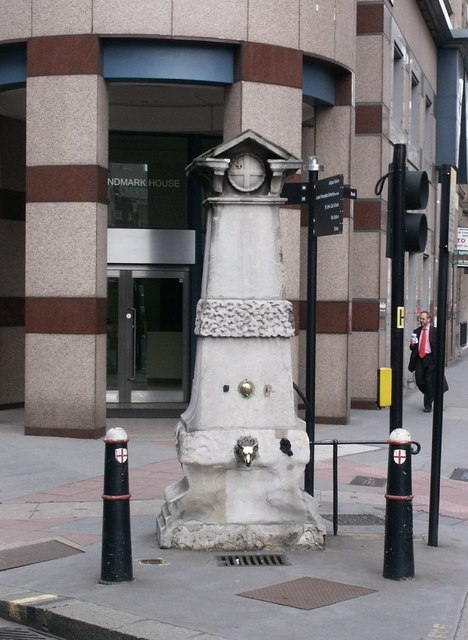
Aldgate Pump, at the junction of Aldgate, Leadenhall Street and Fenchurch Street

From 1700 distances into Essex and Middlesex were measured from Aldgate Pump. The original pump was taken down in 1876, and a "faux" pump and drinking fountain was erected several yards to the west of the original; it was supplied by water from the New River.

In ancient deeds, Alegate Well is mentioned, adjoining the City wall, and this may have been the source (of water) for the original pump. A section of the remains of Holy Trinity Priory can be seen through a window in a nearby office block, on the north side.

=== Aldgate Square ===
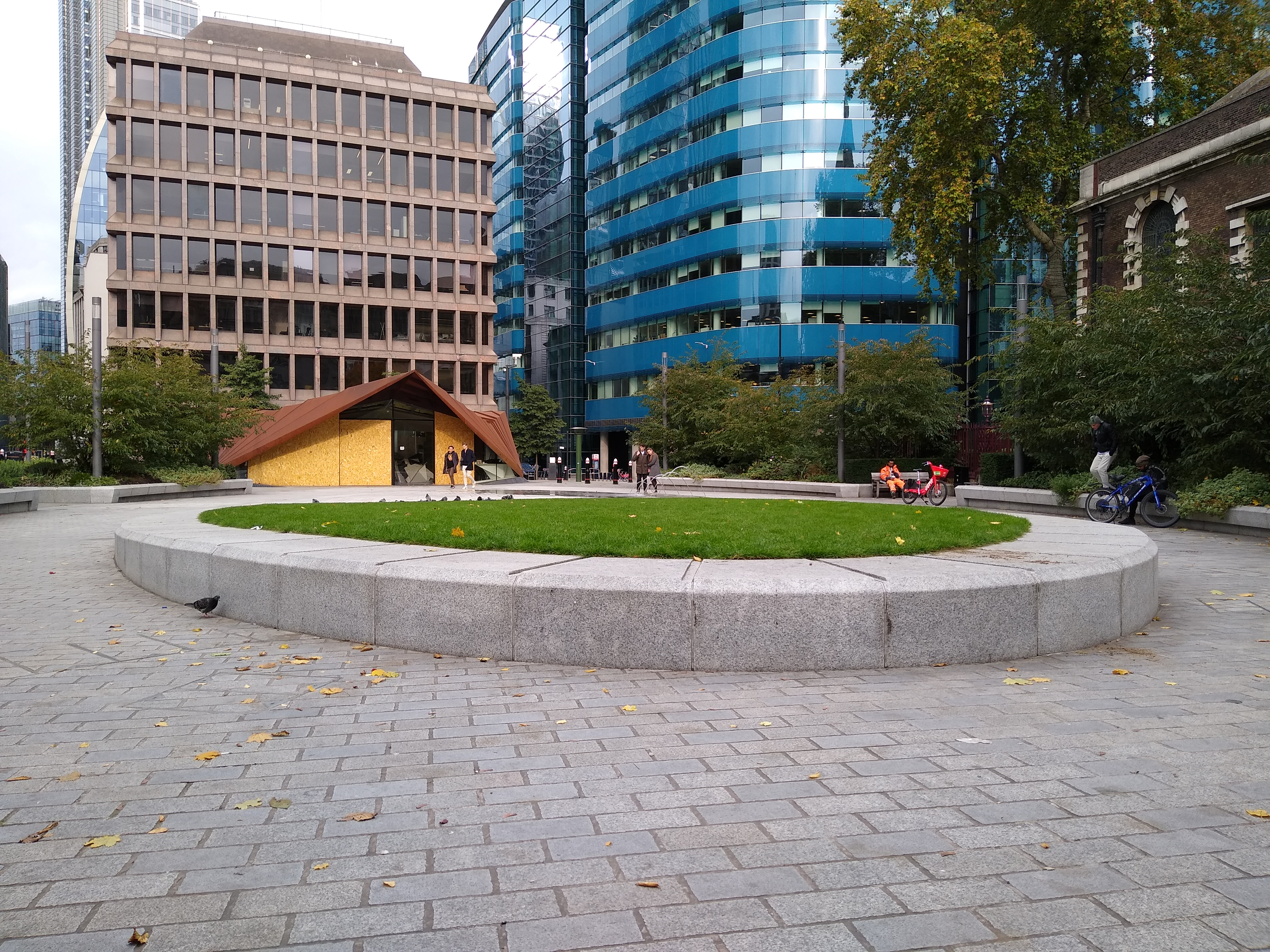
Aldgate Square.

In the 1970s, the historic street pattern in central Aldgate was altered to form one large traffic gyratory at the junction which included Whitechapel High Street and Commercial Road. This was followed by office development on the traffic island at the centre, and a network of underground subways was constructed to provide pedestrian access beneath the one-way system and to provide a link to the London Underground stations. This led to parts of Aldgate being protected in the Whitechapel High Street Conservation Area and there are numerous listed buildings.

Aldgate Square, a new public square sited between two heritage listed buildings, The Aldgate School and the church of St Botolph without Aldgate, was opened on 15 June 2018 by the Lord Mayor of the City of London. The cafe on the square, Portsoken Pavilion (named after the extramural Portsoken ward), was designed by Make, architects of the award-winning Visitor Information Centre at St Paul's Cathedral.

The alignment of the former London Wall, and with it the start of the East End of London, is prominently marked by a course of paving on the western side of the square.

=== Public artworks ===
Notable sculptures in Aldgate are the bronze abstract "Ridirich" (1980) by Keith McCarter in the Square between Little Somerset Street and the bus garage on Aldgate High Street; "Sanctuary" (1985) outside the church of St Botolph without Aldgate made of fibreglass by Naomi Blake; "The Spitalfields Column" (1995) cast in bronze by Richard Perry marking the entrance to Petticoat Lane Market at the southern end of Middlesex Street; six hurtling bronze horses (2015) by Hamish Mackie in the piazza at Goodman's Fields.

=== Archaeological finds ===
In 2013 in Minories, Aldgate – on the last day of excavations – archaeologists found a 1,900-year-old Roman sculpture from the late 1st or early 2nd century AD in what was Roman London's "Eastern Cemetery". "The Minories Eagle", hailed by experts as one of the rarest and finest artefacts ever unearthed in Britain would have stood in a niche in a mausoleum above the tomb of a very powerful and wealthy man. Carved in Cotswold oolitic stone and rich in iconography it shows an exquisitely carved and outstandingly preserved eagle with a serpent in its beak. It was exhibited at the Museum of London in October 2013.

== Ward of Aldgate ==
Aldgate is one of the 25 wards of the City of London, with the City forming the historic and financial centre of Greater London, England. It is named after the gate in the London Wall which once enclosed the City. The Wards each elect an Alderman to the Court of Aldermen and Commoners (the City equivalent of a councillor) to the Court of Common Council of the City of London Corporation. Only electors who have Freedom of the City (thus Freemen), are eligible to stand.

The Wards of London appear to have taken shape in the 11th century, before the Norman Conquest. Their administrative, judicial and military purpose made them equivalent to Hundreds in the countryside. The primary purpose of Wards like Aldgate, which included a gate, appears to be the defence of the gate, as gates were the weakest points in any fortification.

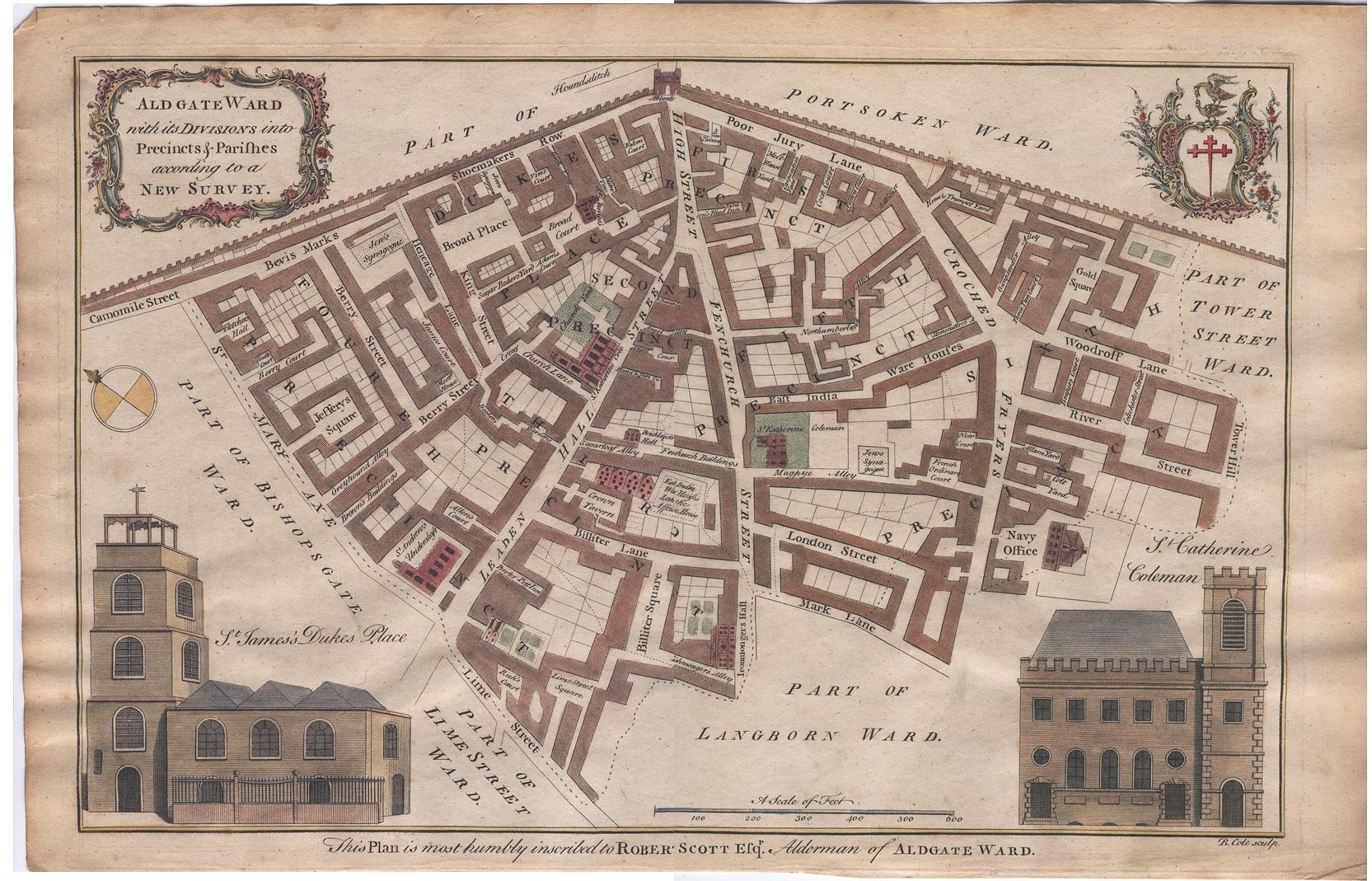
Cole's 1755 map of Aldgate ward (note east is to top of page)

The historic (pre-2013) boundaries of the Ward. Aldgate lay entirely inside the Wall, The Portsoken outside of it - to the east.

Ward boundaries between 2003 and 2013

The historic City ward is bounded on the east by the line of the former London Wall, effectively parallel with Houndsditch, which separates it from the Portsoken ward.

Since major boundary changes in 2013, the ward is now bounded by White Kennet Street in the north and Crutched Friars in the south, taking in Leadenhall and Fenchurch Streets. It therefore now includes a small area outside the line of the former walls.

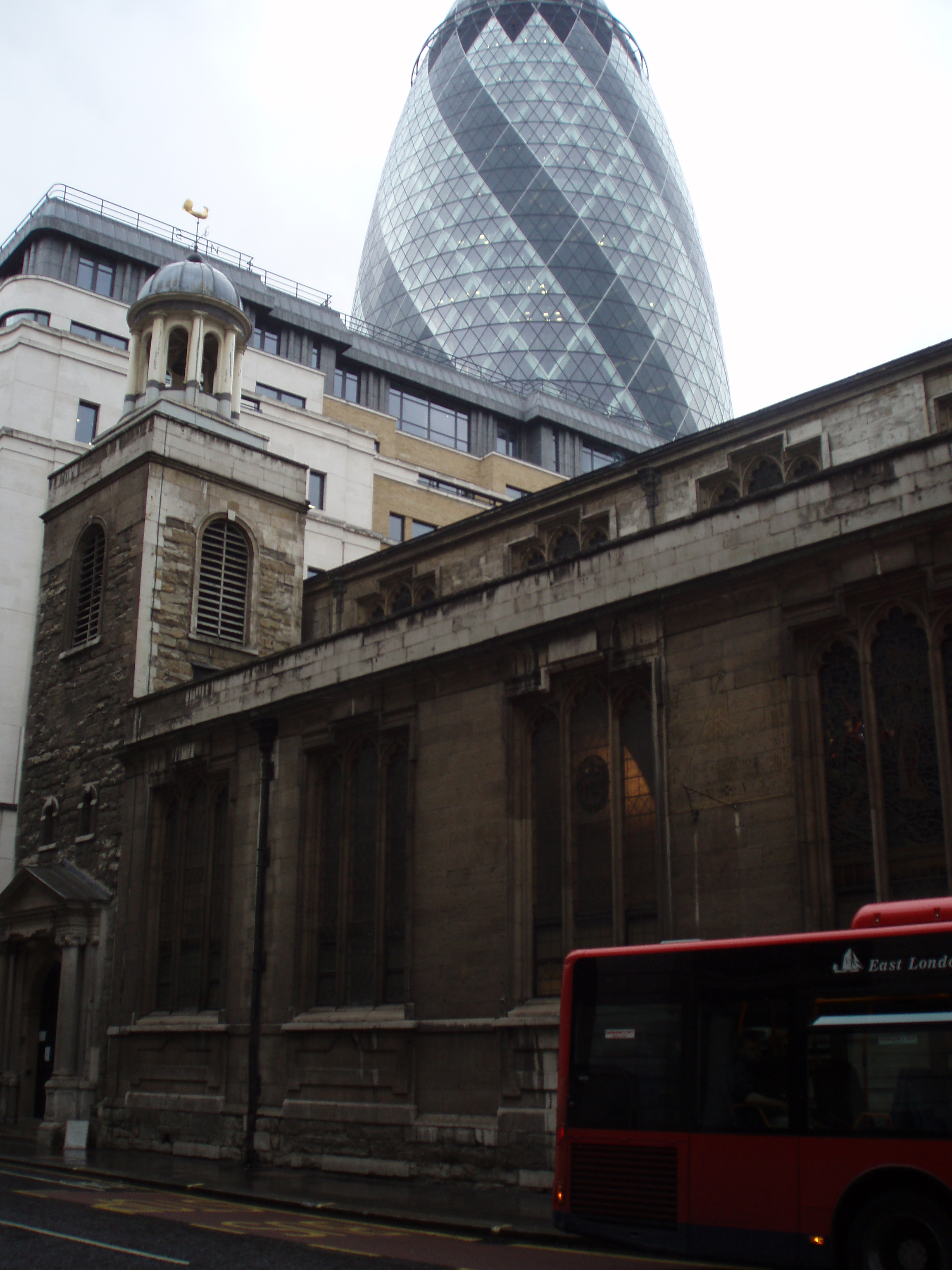
St Katharine Cree, with 30 St Mary Axe behind

The Augustinians Holy Trinity Priory was founded by Matilda, the wife of King Henry I, in 1108, on ground just inside the gate.

Within Aldgate ward, a short distance to the north of the gate, Jews settled from 1181, until their expulsion in 1290 by King Edward I. The area became known as Old Jewry. Jews were permitted to return by Oliver Cromwell, and once again they settled in the area, founding London's oldest synagogue at Bevis Marks in 1698.

On 10 April 1992 the Provisional IRA detonated a bomb close to the Baltic Exchange, severely damaging the historic building and neighbouring structures. 30 St Mary Axe (formerly the Swiss Re Building) now occupies the site, and the Baltic Exchange is located at 38 St Mary Axe.

The ward today is dominated by the insurance industry, with several brokers and underwriters based there; prominent buildings include the Lloyd's Register building, 30 St Mary Axe, the Willis Building and the London Metal Exchange.

Three churches are located in Aldgate ward: St. Botolph's, St Katharine Cree (1631) and St Andrew Undershaft (1532) – administered from St. Helen's in Lime Street ward.

The Bevis Marks Synagogue (1699), the oldest in the United Kingdom, is also located in the ward, on Bevis Marks. John Cass's school, where a plaque records the former course of London Wall, is sited on the north side of Aldgate (the street).

== Transport ==
The nearest London Underground station is Aldgate on the Circle and Metropolitan lines; nearby Aldgate East is served today by the District and Hammersmith & City lines. Nearby mainline railway stations are located at Liverpool Street and Fenchurch Street, and Tower Gateway is the closest Docklands Light Railway station.

== See also ==
- Aldersgate, one of the City of London's northern gates.
- City gate
- City wall
- Battle of Cable Street
- Stepney Historical Trust
