= List of liberties in Dorset =

Liberties were an administrative unit of local government in England from the Middle Ages to the nineteenth century, co-existing with the then operative system of hundreds and boroughs but independent of both, generally for reasons of tenure. The following were the liberties in the county of Dorset and the areas they contained:

- Alton Pancras
- Bindon Liberty:

Chaldon Herring
Edmondsham (part)
Moreton (part)
Pulham (part)
West Lulworth
Wool

- Broadwindsor
- Corfe Castle (also described as a hundred)
- Dewlish Liberty:

Dewlish
Milborne St Andrew (part)

- Fordington Liberty:

Fordington
Hermitage
Minterne Magna (part)
Stockland (part) (ie, Dalwood, transferred to Devon 1844)

- Frampton Liberty:

Bettiscombe
Bincombe
Burton Bradstock
Compton Valence
Frampton
Winterborne Came (part)

- Gillingham Liberty:

Bourton (from 1866)
Gillingham
Motcombe

- Halstock
- Loders and Bothenhampton Liberty:

Bothenhampton
Loders

- Owermoigne (formerly part of Winfrith Hundred)
- Piddlehinton
- Piddletrenthide Liberty:

Gorewood (from 1858)
Minterne Magna (part)
Piddletrenthide

- Portland
- Powerstock Liberty:

Powerstock (part)

- Ryme Intrinseca
- Stour Provost
- Stoborough Liberty
- Sutton Poyntz Liberty:

Chickerell (part)
Preston
Stockwood

- Sydling St Nicholas
- Waybayouse or Wabyhouse Liberty:

Upwey (part)

- Wyke Regis and Elwell Liberty:

Elwell, part of the parish of Upwey
Wyke Regis

== Sources ==
- Boswell, Edward, 1833: The Civil Division of the County of Dorset (published on CD by Archive CD Books Ltd, 1992)
- Hutchins, John, History of Dorset, vols 1-4 (3rd ed 1861-70; reprinted by EP Publishing, Wakefield, 1973)
- Mills, A D, 1977, 1980, 1989: Place Names of Dorset, parts 1-3. English Place Name Society: Survey of English Place Names vols LII, LIII and 59/60
