= Fordington =

Fordington may refer to:

- Fordington, Dorset, a suburb of Dorchester, England
- Fordington (liberty), a former liberty in Dorset, England
- Fordington, Lincolnshire, England
