= Waybayouse Liberty =

Former administrative division in Dorset, England

Coordinates: 50.658°N 2.475°W

Waybayouse Liberty or Wabyhouse Liberty was a liberty in the county of Dorset, England, containing part of the parish of Upwey.

== See also ==
- List of liberties in Dorset

== Sources ==
- Boswell, Edward, 1833: The Civil Division of the County of Dorset (published on CD by Archive CD Books Ltd, 1992)
- Hutchins, John, History of Dorset, vols 1-4 (3rd ed 1861–70; reprinted by EP Publishing, Wakefield, 1973)
- Mills, A D, 1977, 1980, 1989: Place Names of Dorset, parts 1–3. English Place Name Society: Survey of English Place Names vols LII, LIII and 59/60
