= Dewlish =

Village and civil parish in Dorset, England

Coordinates: 50.7832°N 2.3208°W

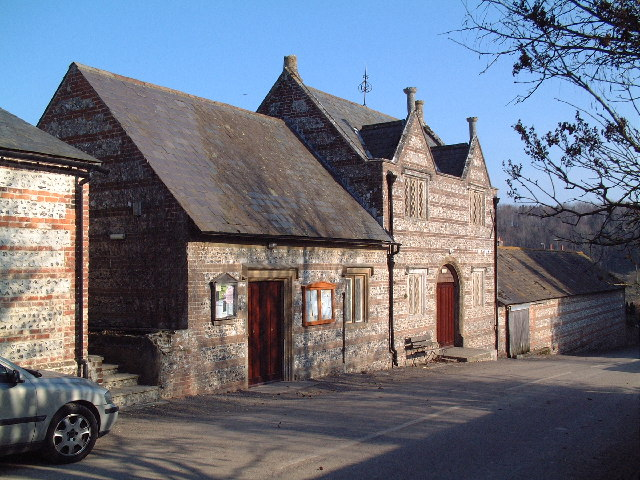
- Dewlish Village Hall

- Location within Dorset
- Population: 284
- OS grid reference: SY775982
- Unitary authority: Dorset
- Ceremonial county: Dorset
- Region: South West
- Country: England
- Sovereign state: United Kingdom
- Post town: Dorchester
- Postcode district: DT2
- Police: Dorset
- Fire: Dorset and Wiltshire
- Ambulance: South Western
- UK Parliament: West Dorset

Dewlish is a village and civil parish in the county of Dorset in southern England, and is situated approximately 7 miles (11 km) north-east of the county town Dorchester. The village is sited in the valley of the small Devil's Brook among the chalk hills of the Dorset Downs; the parish covers about 2,100 acres (850 ha) and extends west to include part of the valley of the small Cheselbourne stream, and east to include a dry valley at Dennet's Bottom. The surrounding area is part of the Dorset National Landscape area. In the 2011 census the parish had a population of 284.

Dewlish was also the main part of the Liberty of the same name, including Dewlish itself and a part of Milborne St Andrew.

== Dewlish House ==
One of the most significant properties in the area, Dewlish House was built in 1702. It served as the childhood home of John Michel (who later became a field marshal) from 1804 to 1823 and later served as his retirement home between 1880 and 1886. Recently owned by Mr and Mrs Anthony Boyden (from 1962 to 2020) the Grade I-listed Queen Anne style house and its 296-acre (120 ha) property were sold in 2020. The buyer was an American already living in the UK.

== Church of All Saints ==
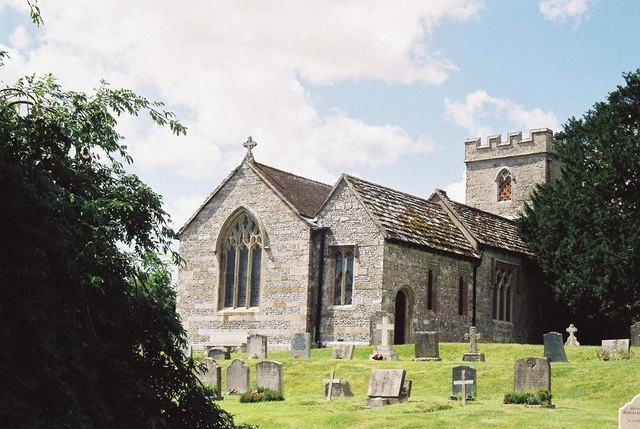
The parish church

The parish church of All Saints, south of the village, is a Grade II* listed building. The oldest parts of the building are of the 12th century, and it was modified and enlarged in the 14th, 15th and 16th centuries. There was restoration in 1872 by T. H. Wyatt, when the south aisle was remodelled and an organ chamber was added. In the north aisle is a monument to Sir John Michel (1886).

== History and prehistory ==
=== Court Close ===
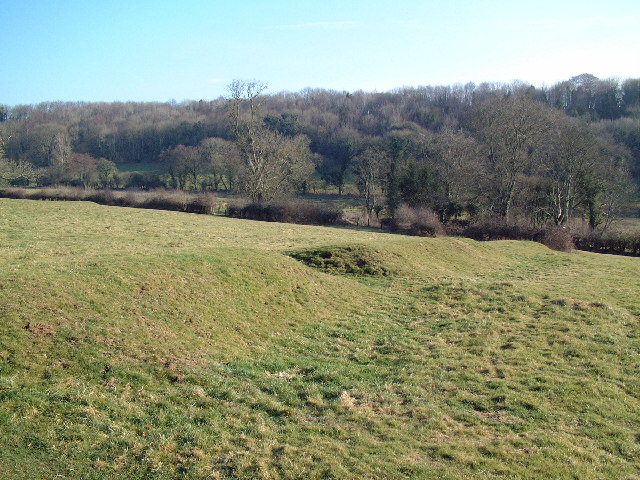
Part of the earthworks of Court Close.

To the east and south of the parish church and west of the Devil's Brook there are earthworks, the remains of a former settlement. They are a scheduled monument. On the tithe map of 1844 it has the name Court Close. It covers an area of about 17 acres (6.9 ha). Most of it is occupied by a large embanked enclosure, within which there are banks and scarps; its purpose is unknown. In the east there is a small rectangular moat, once probably enclosing a manor house.

=== Roman villa ===
About 1740 the tessellated pavement of a Roman villa was discovered in the village, near Michel's Farm. In 1971 a full excavation began of the site; by 1973, 24 rooms of the villa, including a bath suite, had been revealed. Further excavation established that there were three main settlement areas, dating from the Iron Age, early Roman and late Roman, an occupation period of 400 to 500 years.

In February 2021 it was announced that a mosaic from the Roman villa, discovered in 1974, showing a leopard attacking an antelope, would be displayed in the Dorset County Museum at Dorchester, after £150,000 was raised to buy it. It had been bought at auction in 2018 for an international collector, but export was suspended. Jon Murden, director of the museum, said that the piece was "one of the most significant 4th-century Roman mosaics in the country".

== Population ==
Population of Dewlish 1801-1921
1801	1811	1821	1831	1841	1851	1861	1871	1881	1891	1901	1911	1921
348	361	386	361	389	442	458	494	457	396	312	298	251

=== Mammoths ===
In the 19th century the remains of two prehistoric mammoths, dating from about one million years BC, were found in the hillside above the village; two of the tusks were taken to the county museum at Dorchester.
