= Dewlish House =

Grade I listed building in Dorset, England

Coordinates: 50.7761°N 2.3264°W

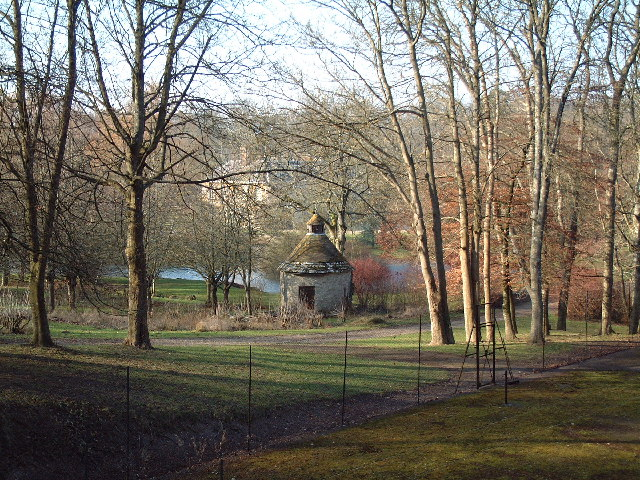
Dewlish House through the trees

Dewlish House is a country house near Dewlish in Dorset. It is a Grade I Listed building.

== History ==
Dewlish House, built in 1702, became the home of the Michel family in the 1756. It served as the childhood home of John Michel (who later became a field marshal) from 1804 to 1823 and later served as his retirement home between 1880 and 1886. The historic listing was added in 1956.

Recently owned by Mr and Mrs Anthony Boyden (from 1962 to 2020) the Grade I-listed Queen Anne style house and its 296-acre (120 ha) property were sold in 2020. The buyer was an American already living in the UK.

The "Queen Anne/Georgian" house was built in 1702 by Thomas Skinner; it was modified during the 1900s, according to Country Life (magazine), with "the removal of an 18th- and 19th-century service wing some time in the 20th century. In addition to the 12,800 sq ft (1,190 m^{2}) home, the property includes "stabling, six cottages, outbuildings and 134 acres (54 ha) of gardens, grounds, pasture and park-land".
