= Holyrood Park =

Park in Edinburgh, Scotland

Coordinates: 55°56′54″N 3°09′32″W

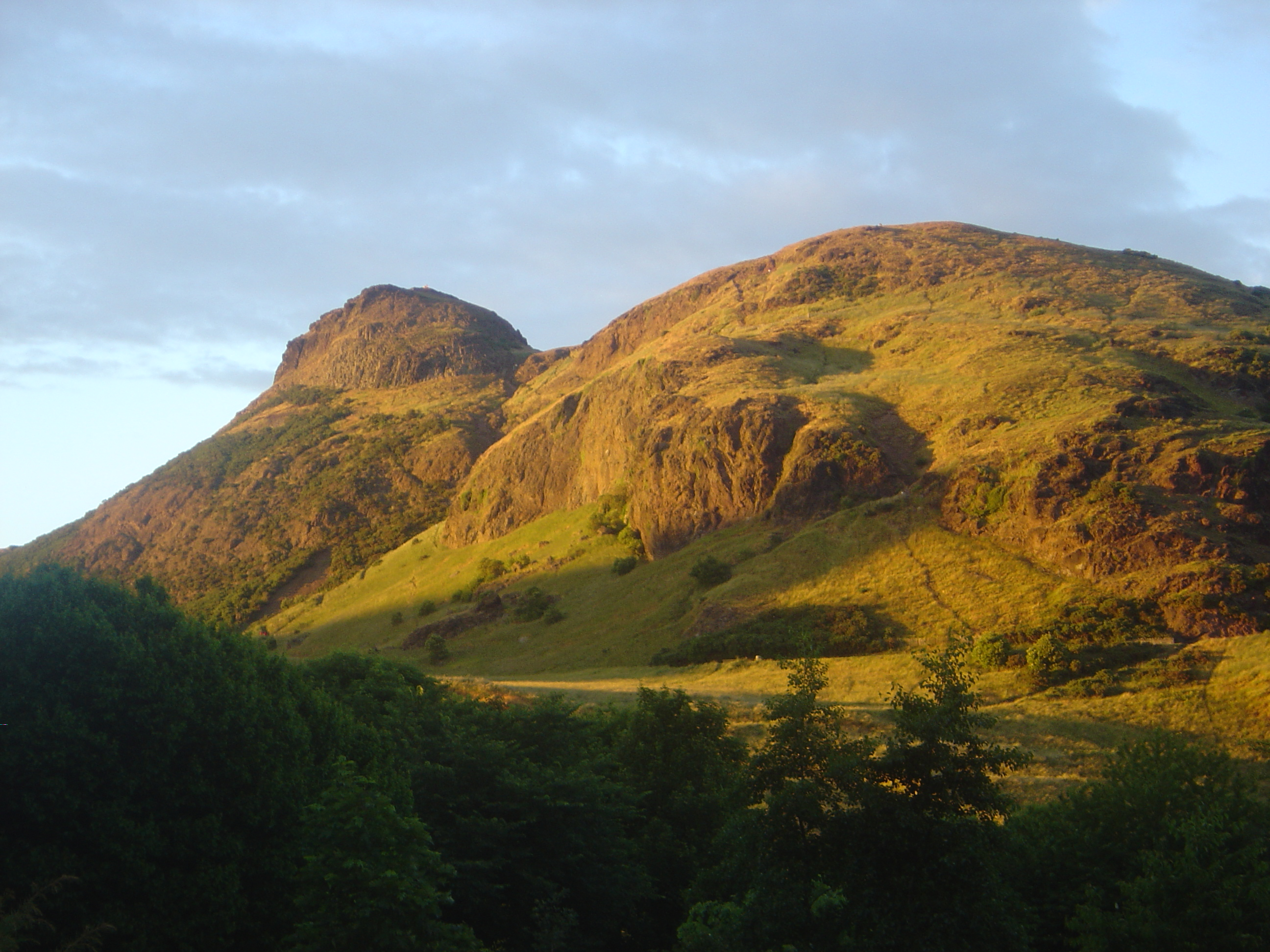
- Arthur's Seat is located within Holyrood Park

- Location within the City of Edinburgh council area
- Type: Urban park
- Location: Edinburgh
- Area: 650 acres (260 ha)
- Created: 1541
- Status: Open all year

Holyrood Park (the official name since at least the 1950s, as outlined in the ‘Holyrood Park Regulations 1959’ but also colloquially called the King's Park or Queen's Park depending on the reigning monarch's gender) is a public park in central Edinburgh, Scotland about 1 mile (1.6 kilometres) to the east of Edinburgh Castle. It has an array of hills, lochs, glens, ridges, basalt cliffs, and patches of gorse, providing a wild piece of highland landscape within its 650-acre (260 ha) area. The park is associated with the Palace of Holyroodhouse and was formerly a royal hunting estate. The park was created in 1541 when James V had the ground "circulit about Arthurs Sett, Salisborie and Duddingston craggis" enclosed by a stone wall.

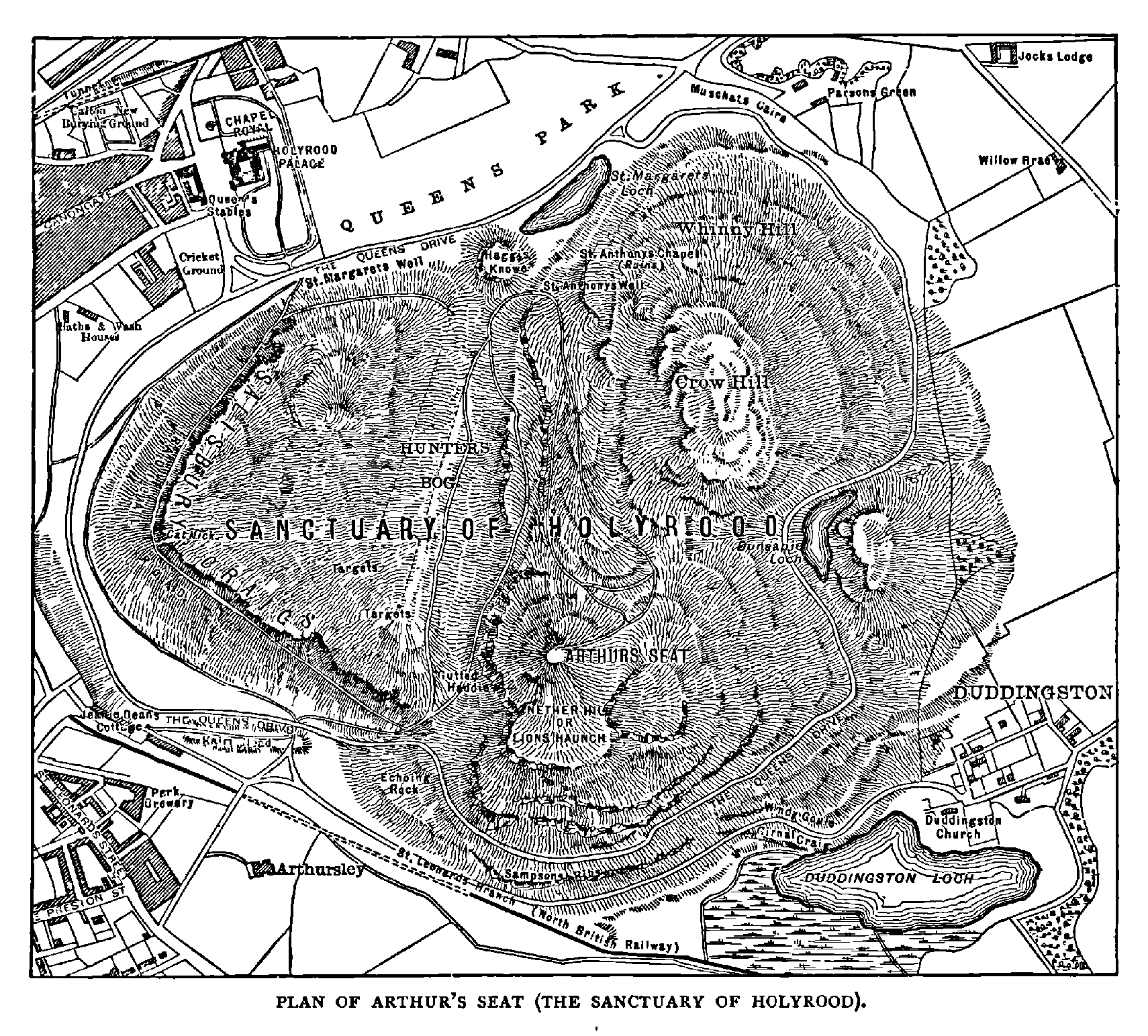
1880s map of the park

Arthur's Seat, an extinct volcano and the highest point in Edinburgh, is at the centre of the park, with the cliffs of Salisbury Crags to the west. There are three lochs: St Margaret's Loch, Dunsapie Loch, and Duddingston Loch. The ruins of St Anthony's Chapel stand above St Margaret's Loch. Queen's Drive is the main route for motor traffic through the Park. St Margaret's Well and St Anthony's Well are both natural springs within the park. Holyrood Park is located to the south-east of the Old Town, at the edge of the city centre. Abbeyhill is to the north, and Duddingston village to the east. The University of Edinburgh's Pollock Halls of Residence are to the south-west, and Dumbiedykes is to the west.

Holyrood Park is owned by the Scottish Ministers, apart from the roads which are classed as Crown Property, the whole being managed by Historic Environment Scotland.

The whole of Holyrood Park with the exception of the occupied buildings, including the lodges, was made a scheduled monument in 2013. Although various archaeological surveys have taken place across the site, the archaeology is still not fully understood in great detail.

== Natural features ==
=== Arthur's Seat ===
Arthur's Seat is the main peak of the group of hills which form most of Holyrood Park. The hill rises above the city to a height of 251 metres (823 ft), provides excellent views, is quite easy to climb, and is a popular walk. Though it can be climbed from almost any direction, the easiest and simplest ascent is from the east, where a grassy slope rises above Dunsapie Loch, a small artificial loch located between Dunsapie Hill and Arthur's Seat and which is a popular location within the park, supporting several bird species.

=== Salisbury Crags ===
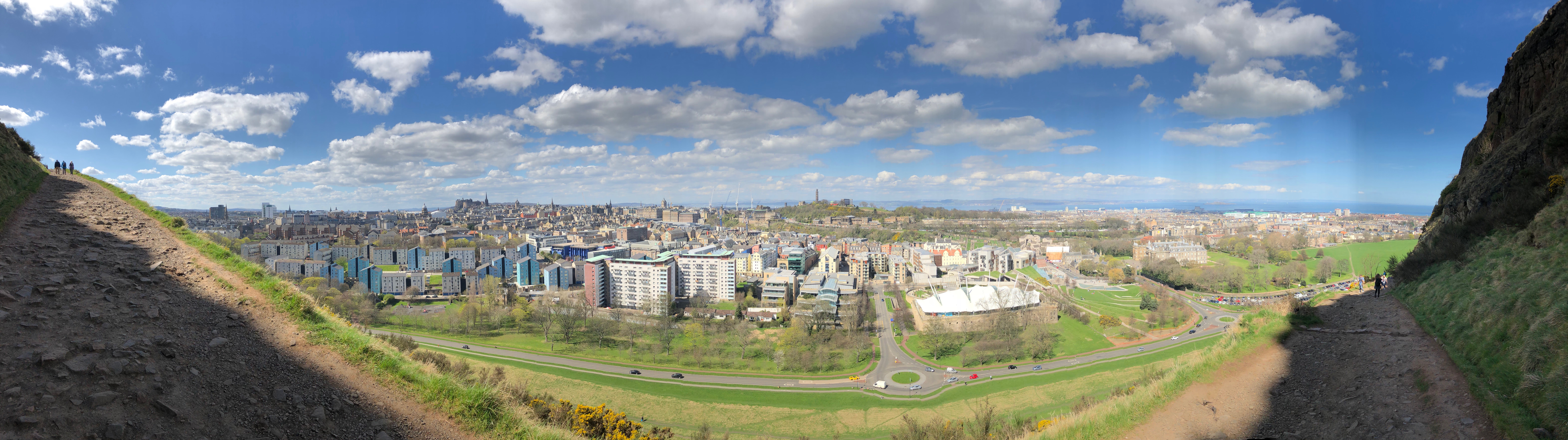
Panoramic view over the park from the Radical Road track

Salisbury Crags are a series of 46-metre (151 ft) cliffs at the top of a subsidiary spur of Arthur's Seat which rise on the west of Holyrood Park. Below the foot of the cliffs is a large and steep talus slope falling to the floor of Holyrood Park, with a track running in the space between the two. This track was given the name Radical Road after it was paved in the aftermath of the Radical War of 1820 to provide jobs for unemployed radical weavers from the west of Scotland, at the suggestion of Walter Scott.

Creation of the Radical Road gave easy access to the upper rockface, and infamously the official Keeper of the Royal Park, Charles Hamilton, 8th Earl of Haddington, abused his position to start quarrying the rock face around 1821, causing damage that is still visible.

Hugo Arnot suggested in the 18th century that the name Salisbury Crags derives from the first Earl of Salisbury, who accompanied Edward III of England on one of his invasions of Scotland. James Grant's view of this in 1880 is that it was "an idle story", and quoted Lord Hailes' derivation from Anglo-Saxon meaning "waste or dry habitation". The modern Gaelic name of the cliffs is Creagan Salisbury.

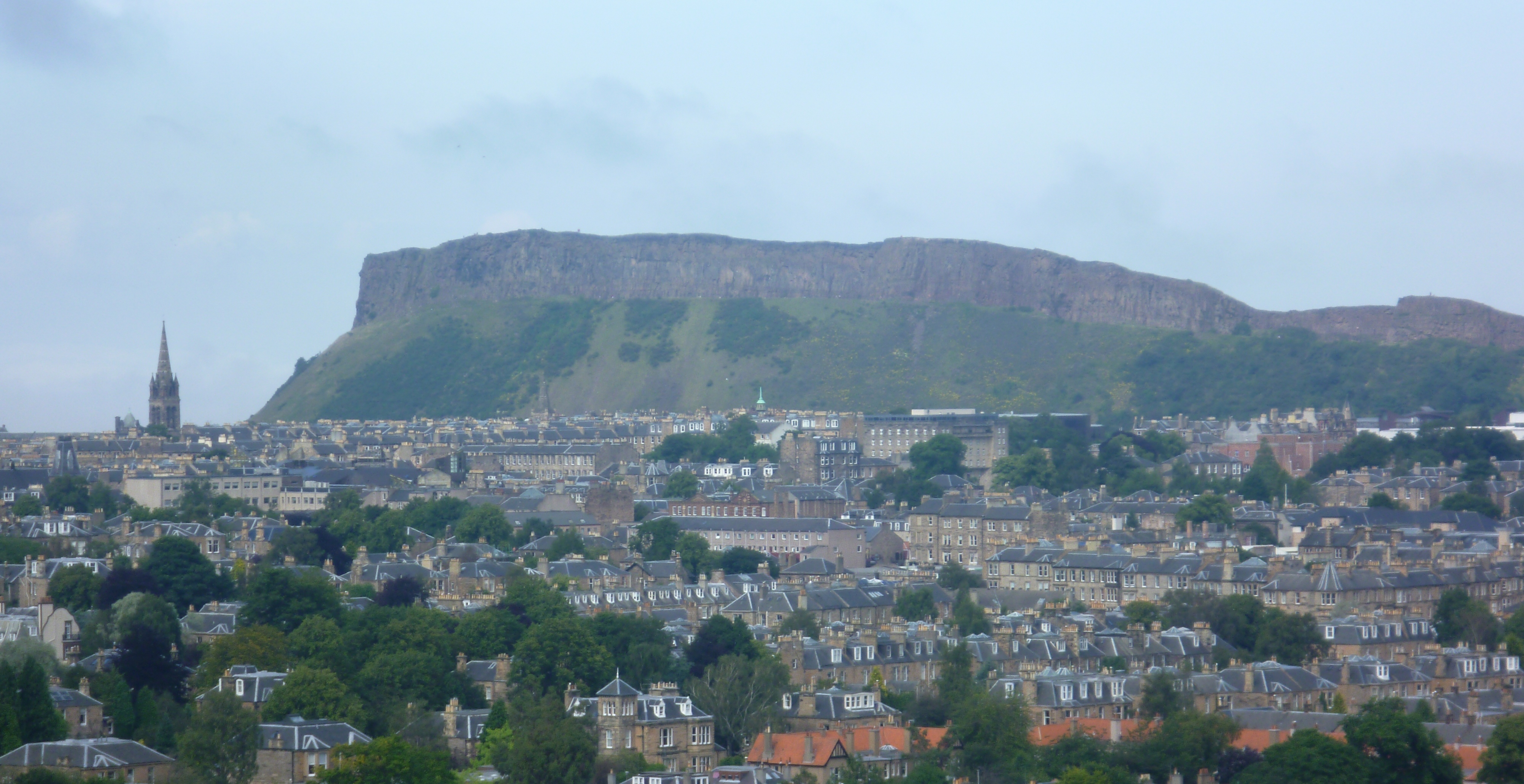
Salisbury Crags seen from Blackford Hill

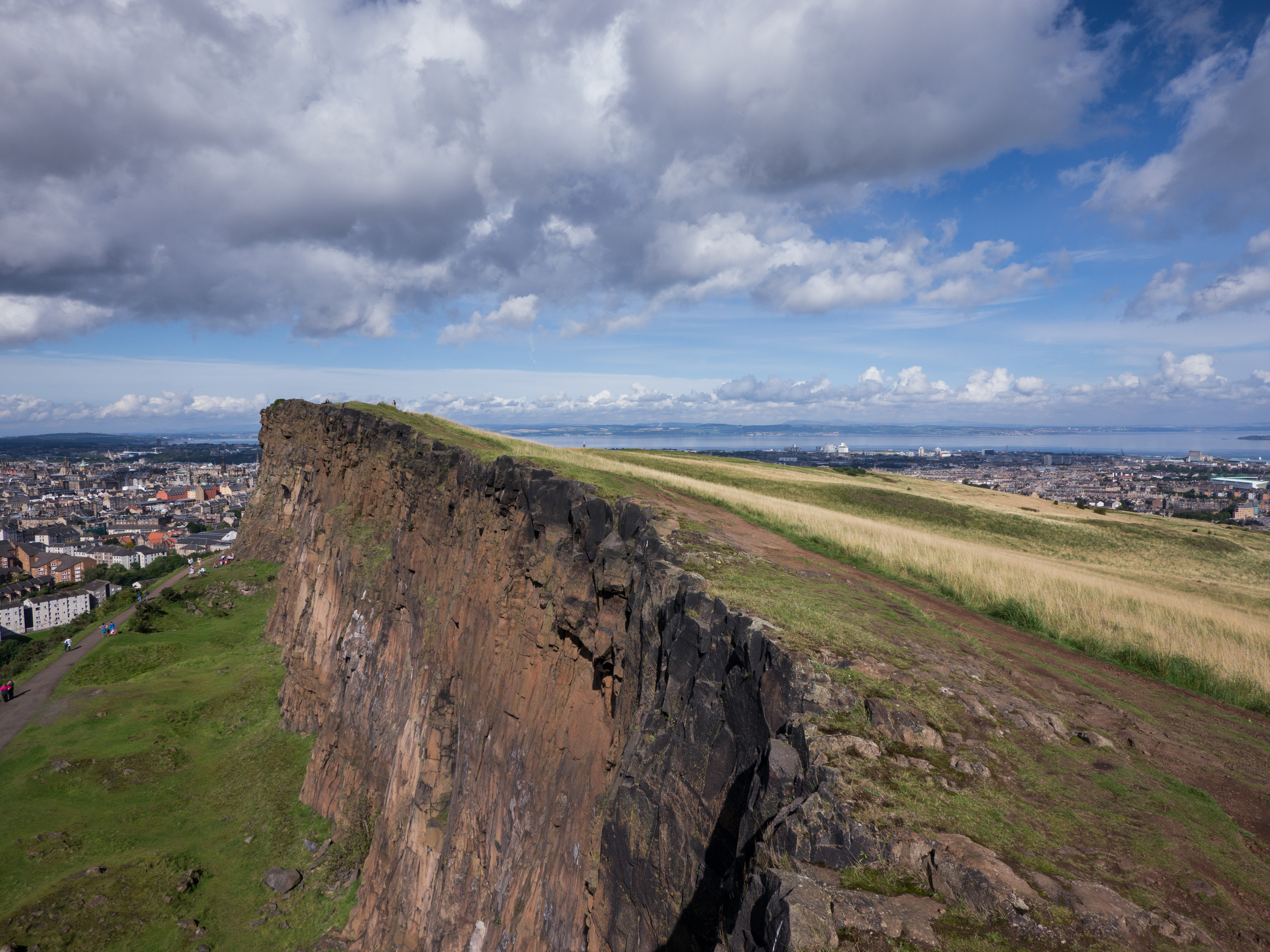
View down over the crags, with walkers on the Radical Road.

The cliffs are formed from steep dolerite and columnar basalt and have a long history of rock climbing on their faces starting from the earliest days of the sport. Harold Raeburn was brought up nearby, and became the leading climber of the Scottish Mountaineering Club not long after he joined it in 1896. By 1900 a number of traditional climbing and sport climbing routes had been recorded by Raeburn and W. Inglis Clark. In recent years the park rangers (previously under the auspices of the Royal Estate and now Historic Environment Scotland, who had taken over management of the park) attempted to regulate access to the cliffs due to hazards to park visitors from loose and falling rocks. Climbers are now restricted to a designated area of the South Quarry, and need to apply for a permit, free of charge, at the education centre in the north of the park in order to be allowed to climb. There is still some activity, though most of it is bouldering rather than free climbing. The finest areas are in the two quarries, although it is only in the South Quarry that climbing is still permitted at this time. The south quarry contains the Black Wall, a well-known bouldering testpiece in the Edinburgh climbing scene. The best known route to climb the Crags is at "Cat Nick" or "Cat's Nick", a cleft in the rocks near the highest point of the Crags. This is named on maps, sometimes leading people to believe that the highest point of the crag is so named.

The Radical Road was closed in 2018 after a large rock fall. A report suggested various possibilities: a sky walkway, reopening the path at users' risk, installing shelters or wire mesh, or permanent closure. In December 2025, Historic Environment Scotland announced plans to re-open the section of the track between the Hawse and the northern end of the South Quarry. This followed inspection and descaling work, rock trajectory modelling and ecological impact assessments. The track was expected to be opened by June 2026.

=== Samson's Ribs ===
Samson's Ribs are a formation of columnar basalt.

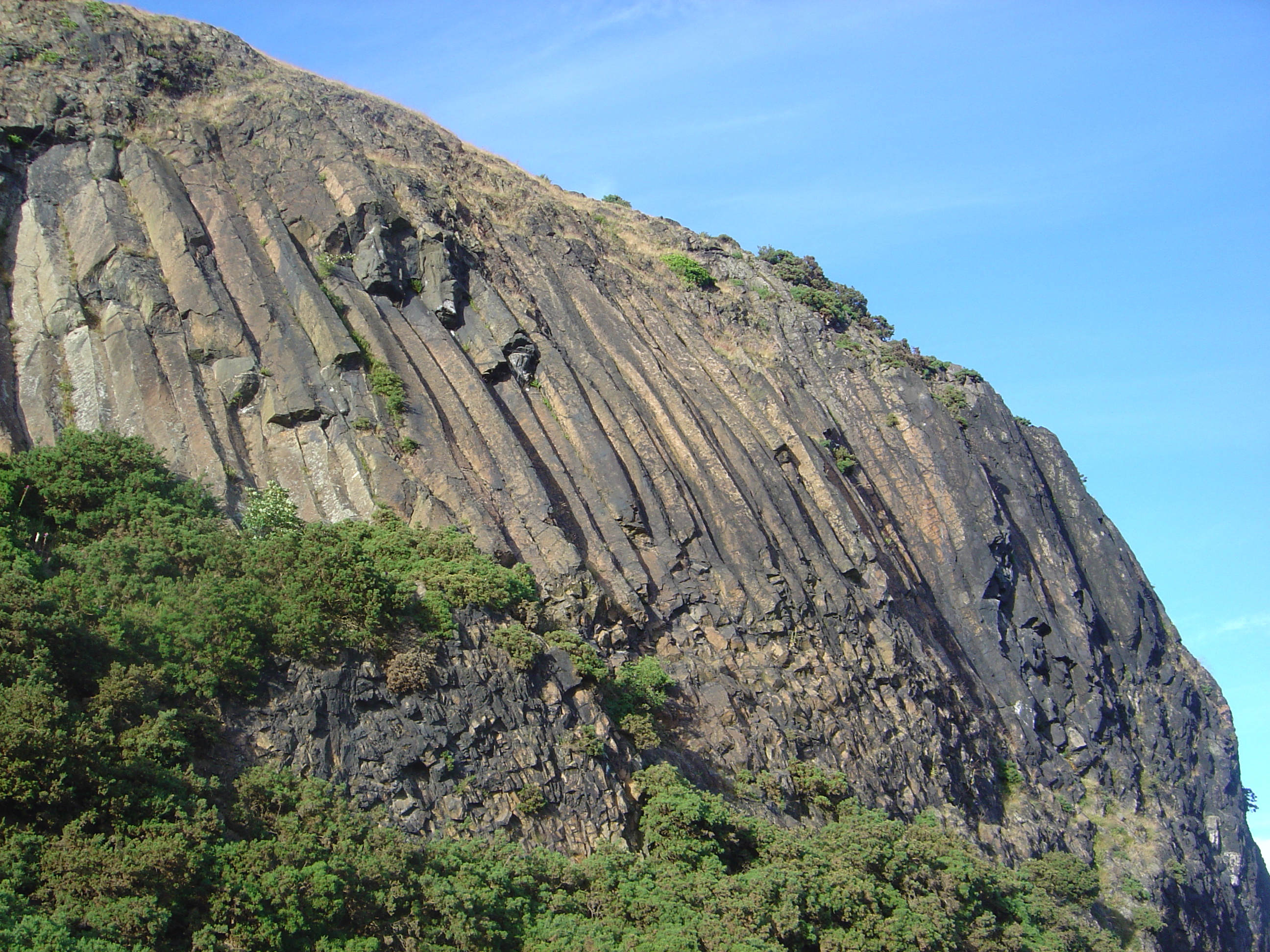

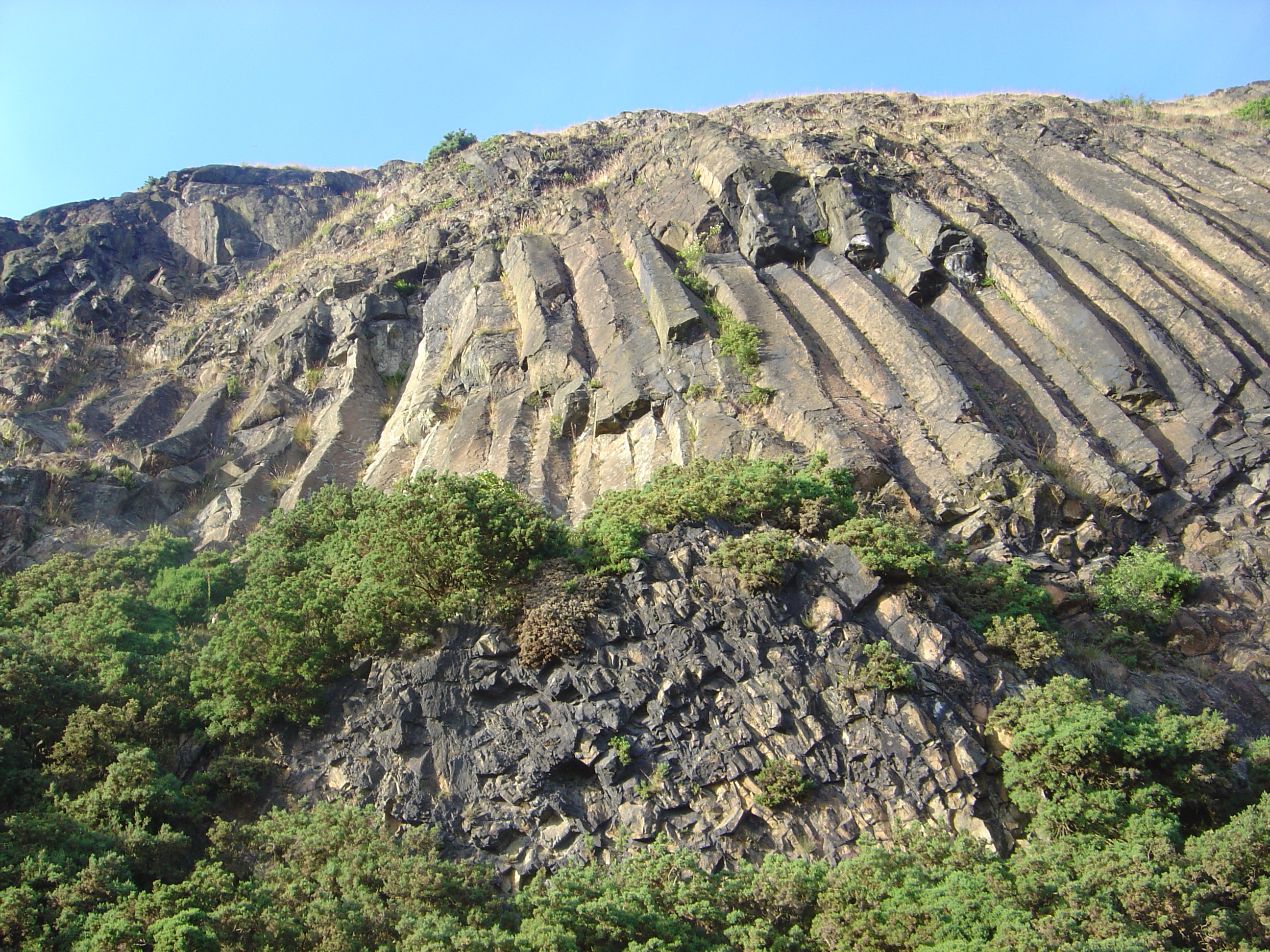

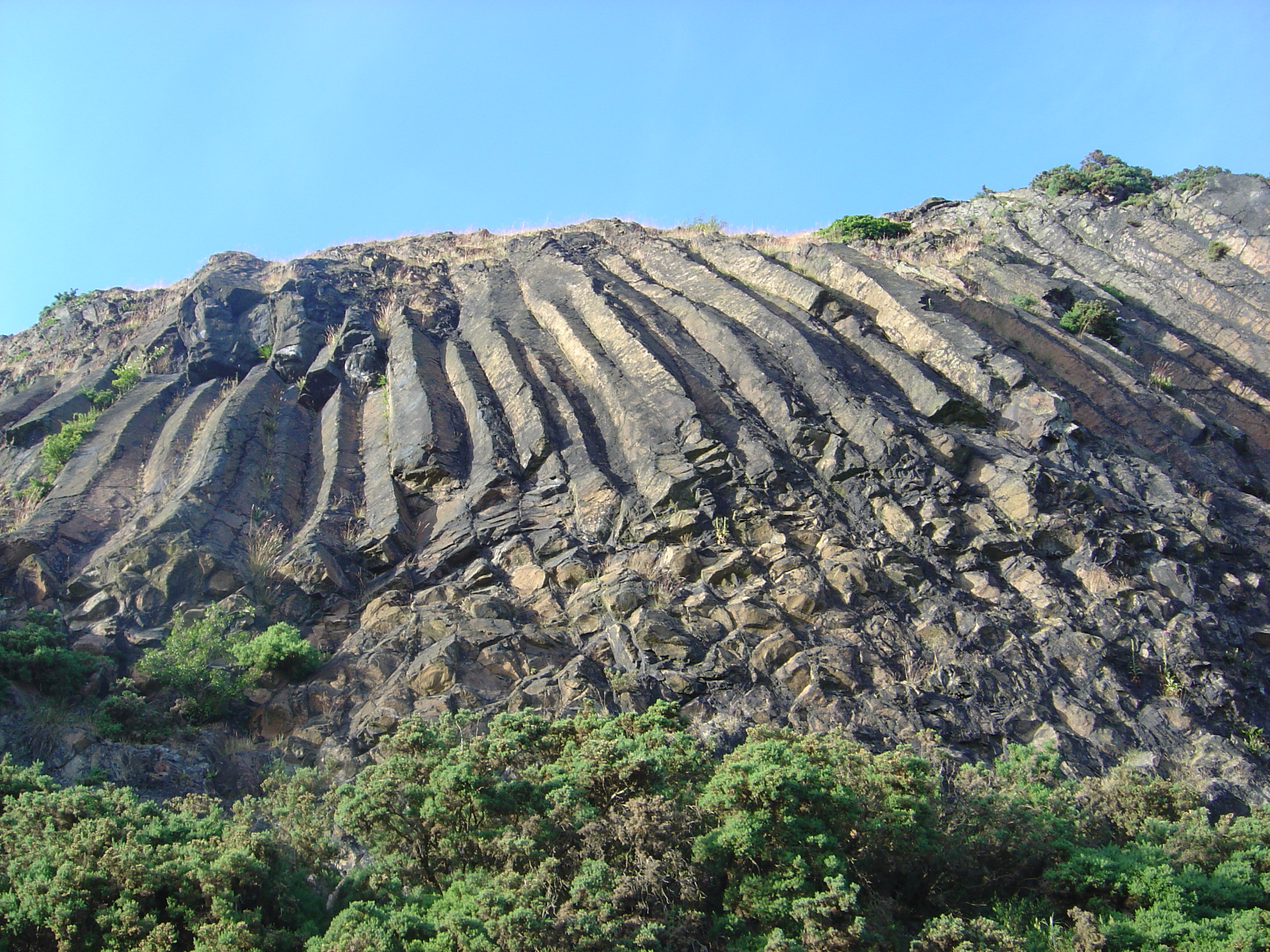

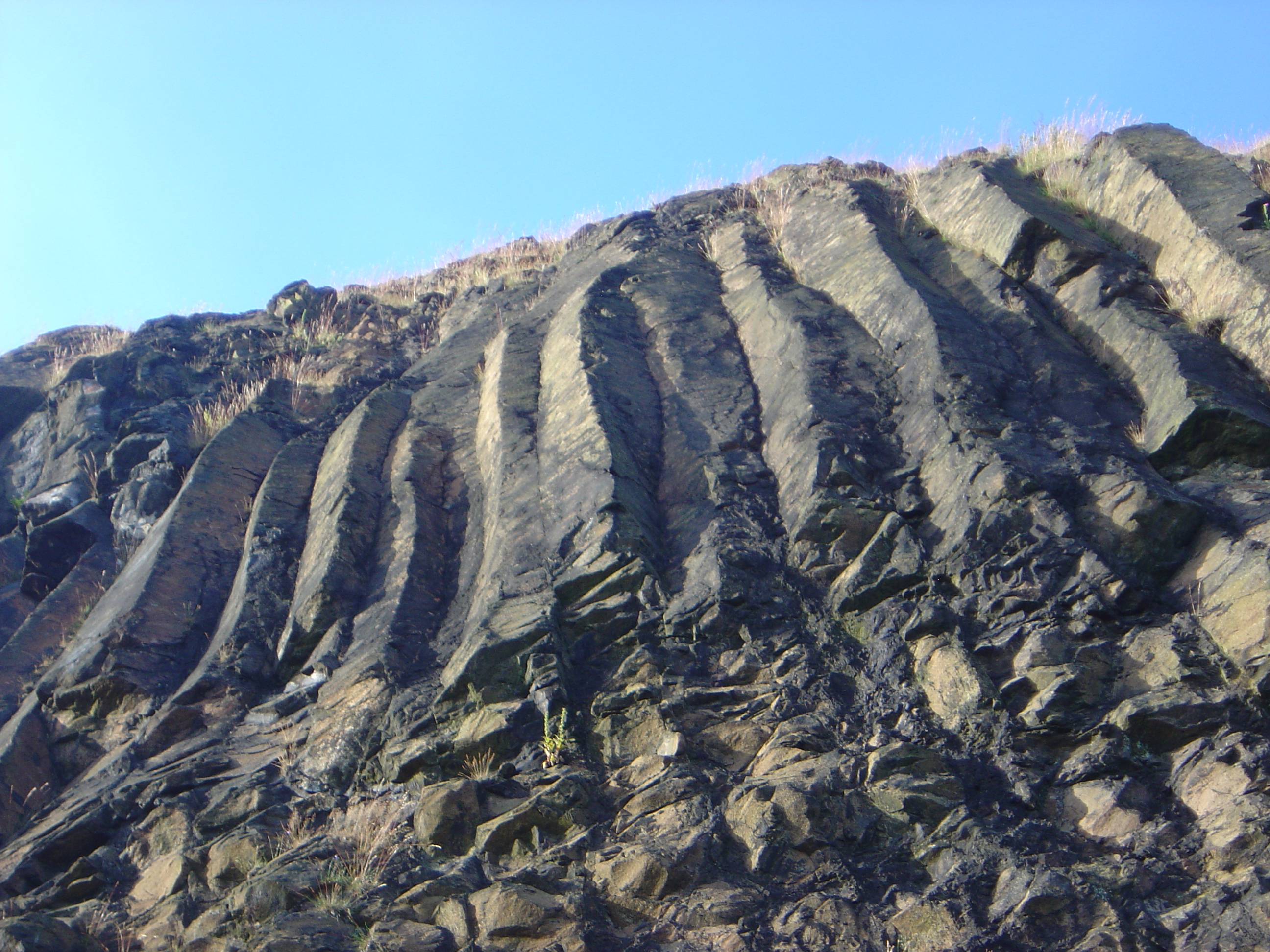

=== St Margaret's Loch ===
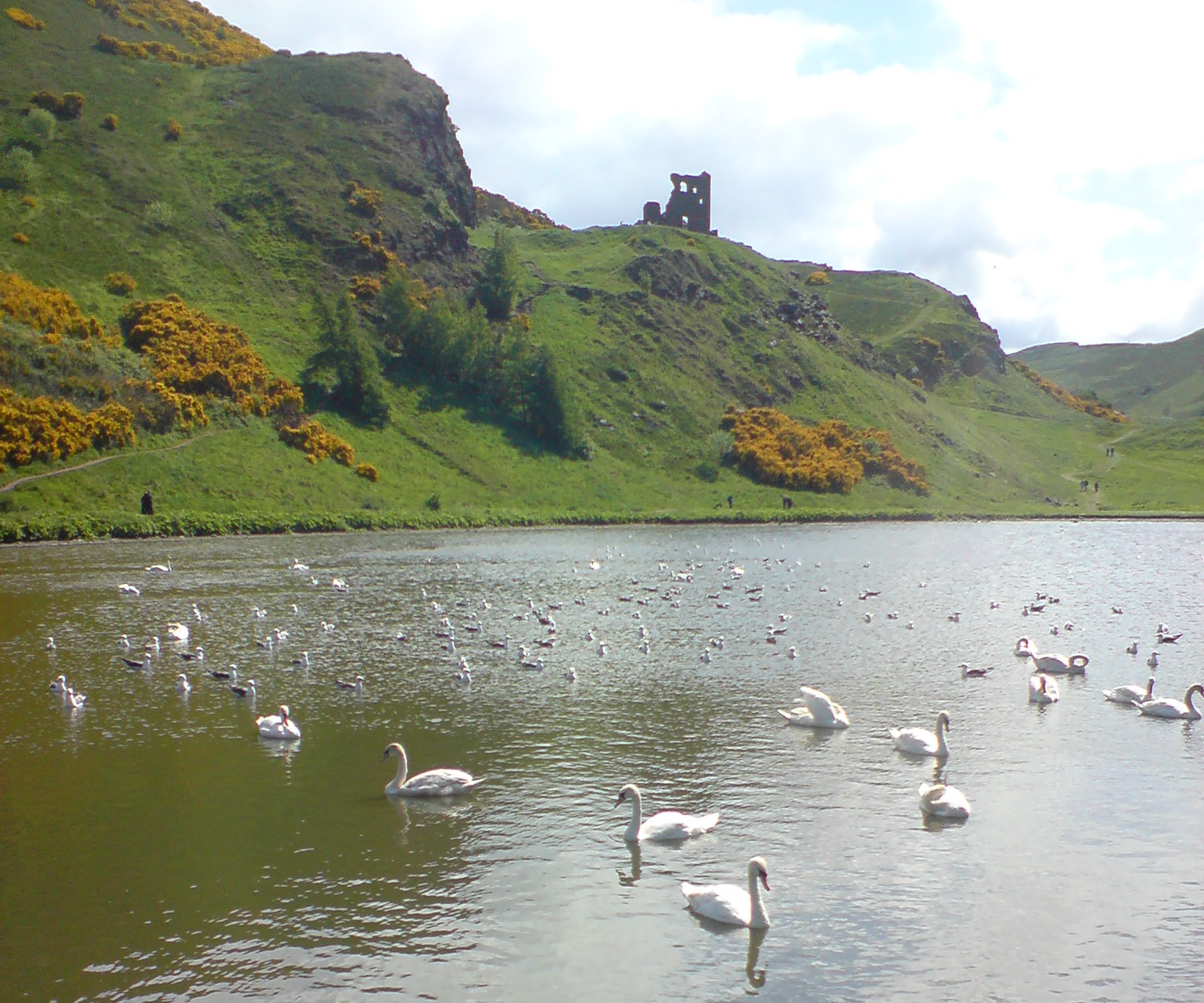
Looking south over St Margaret's Loch, towards St Anthony's Chapel

St Margaret's Loch is a shallow man-made lochan to the south of Queen's Drive. It is around 500 m east of the Palace of Holyroodhouse, and about 100 m north of the ruin of St Anthony's Chapel. Once a boggy marshland, the loch was formed in 1856 as part of Prince Albert's improvement plans for the area surrounding the palace. The loch has been used as a boating pond but is now home to a strong population of ducks, geese, and swans.

=== Other geographical features ===
Other geographical features include the Haggis Knowe, Whinny Hill and Hunter's Bog, which drains into St Margaret's Loch.

== Cultural heritage ==
There are traces of four prehistoric hill forts within the park, at Arthur's Seat, Salisbury Crags, Samson's Ribs and Dunsapie Hill. The remains of cultivation terraces can be seen on the eastern slopes of Arthur's Seat.

=== Holyrood Abbey ===
The ruined Augustinian Abbey of Holyrood was established in 1128, at the order of King David I of Scotland, within his royal deer-hunting park. The abbey was in use until the 16th century. It was briefly used as a chapel royal by James VII, but was finally ruined in the mid-18th century.

=== Palace of Holyroodhouse ===
The Palace of Holyroodhouse began as a lodging within the Abbey, but eventually grew into a substantial palace. James IV had the first buildings constructed around 1500, although the bulk of the present building dates from the late 17th century, when it was remodelled in the neo-classical style by Sir William Bruce. It remains as the official residence of the British monarch in Scotland.

Holyrood Park was augmented in January 1542 with lands at Duddingston bought from David Murray of Balvaird. Both Mary, Queen of Scots, and her father James V kept sheep in some areas of the park, looked after by John Huntar. A dyke was built and then repaired encircling Arthur's Seat and Salisbury and Duddingston Craigs, involving negotiation between Mary of Guise and Edinburgh burgh council.

In May 1562 Dunsapie Loch was the setting for an entertainment at the wedding of John, Lord Fleming, and Elizabeth Ross, which involved a theatrical recreation of the siege of Leith. In May 1565, Mary ordered the construction of a site in Holyrood Park for picnics or banqueting, possibly in connection with her forthcoming wedding to Lord Darnley. In 1595, John Skene estimated that the park could hold 800 wethers and 400 ewes. Mary had a place made for picnic suppers in the park. Sheep continued to be kept inside Holyrood Park until 1975.

=== St Anthony's Chapel ===
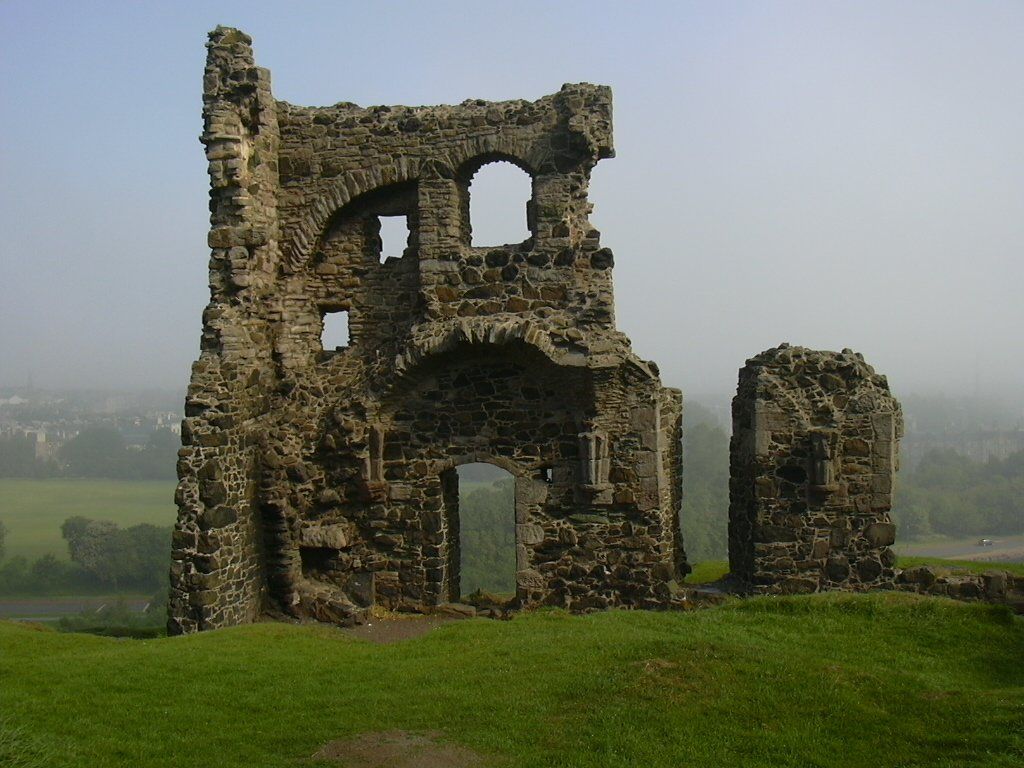
Saint Anthony's Chapel

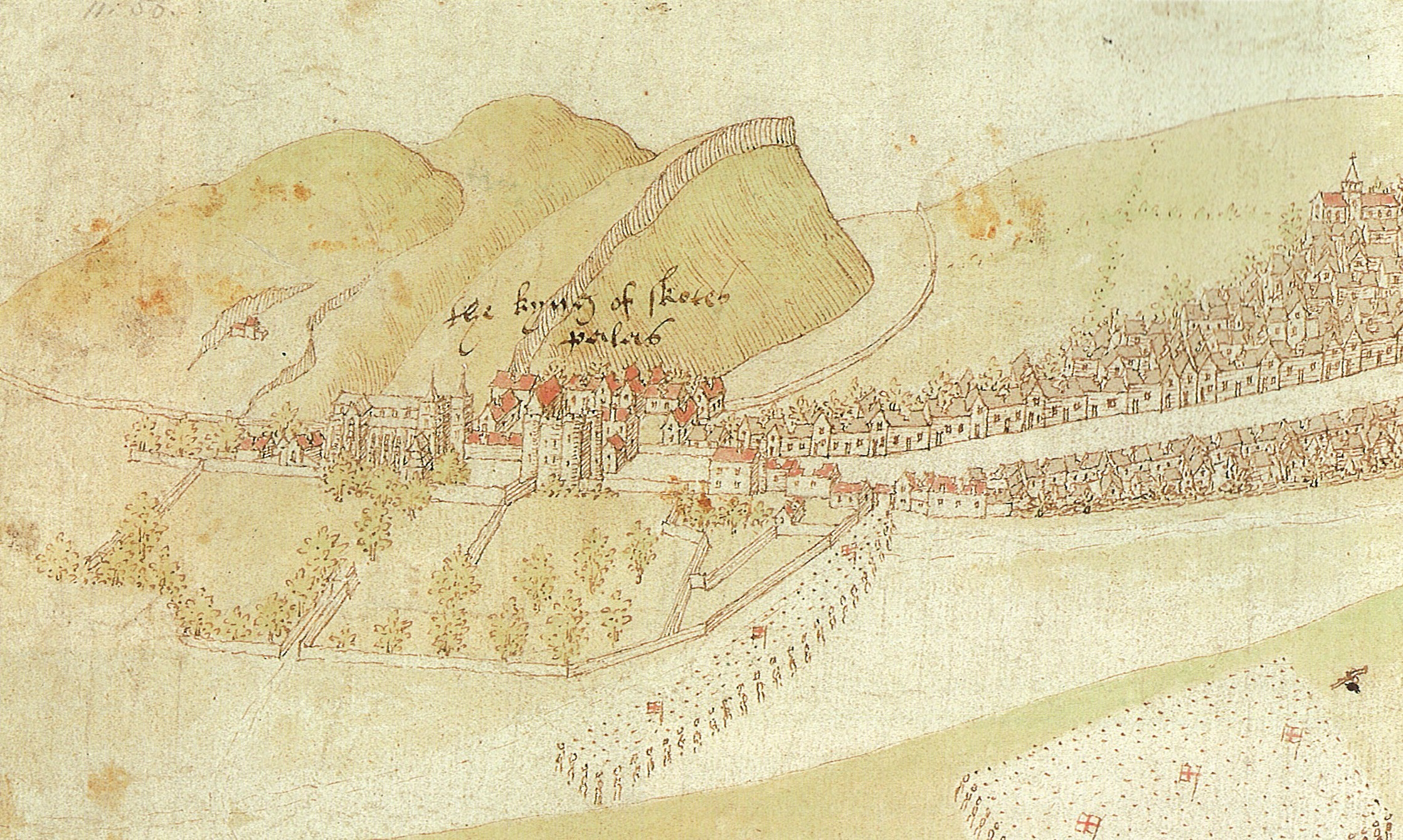
Sketch of Edinburgh showing St Anthony's Chapel in 1544

The origin and history of the chapel are obscure, but it was certainly built no later than the early 15th century, as in 1426 it is recorded that the Pope gave money for its repair. The chapel may have been linked to the Preceptory of St. Anthony, a skin hospice, which was based in Leith around this time. It may have been linked to the nearby Holyrood Abbey. James Grant says that the tradition was that the chapel was set up to protect a nearby holy spring (St Anthony's Well). This apparently dried up completely in 1674 but after some decades it rematerialised at a lower point.

The chapel was originally rectangular in shape, around 43 by 18 feet (13.1 by 5.5 m), with 3-foot-thick (0.9 m) walls, and was built with local stone. The tower would have stood just over 39 ft (11.9 m) high, and probably had a spiral stair inside. The chapel is depicted on Richard Lee's sketch plan of Edinburgh at the time of Lord Hertford's raid on Edinburgh in 1544. The chapel deteriorated over the years and in 1779, Hugo Arnot in his The History of Edinburgh described it as "a beautiful Gothick building, well suited to the rugged sublimity of the rock ... At its west end there was a tower .. about forty feet high."

The chapel is now a ruin: only the north wall and a fragment of the west wall remain next to part of an ancillary building.

=== Margaret Hall's Cairn ===
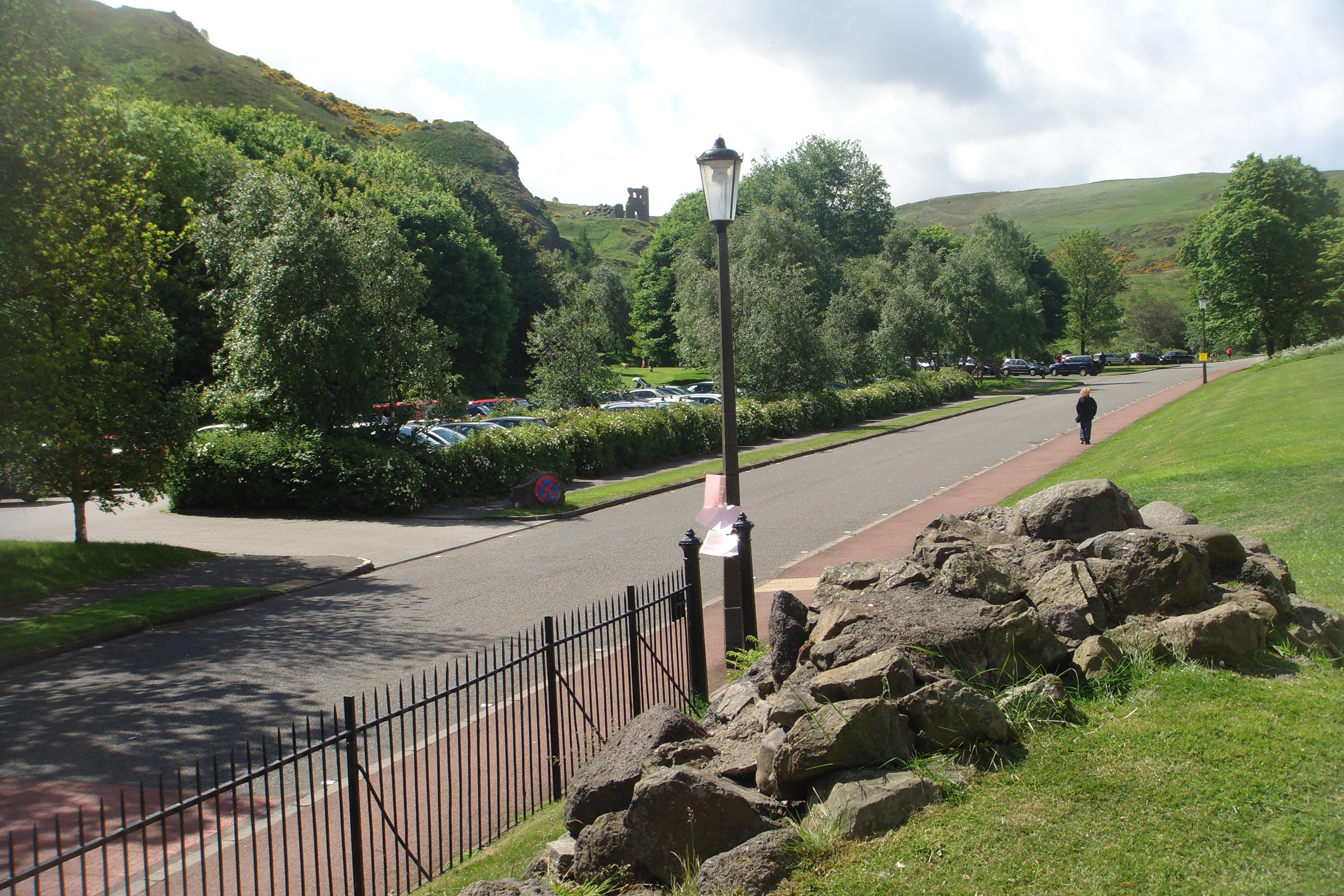
Margaret Hall's Cairn – St Anthony's Chapel can be seen in the distance, centre top

This cairn is situated by the Duke's Walk at the eastern (Meadowbank) end of Holyrood Park. It commemorates an event on 17 October 1720 when Nicol Muschat, an unemployed surgeon, cut his wife, Margaret Hall's, throat at this spot. He was tried and hanged on 6 January 1721 for this crime. At his trial he said that he had simply tired of her.

For centuries, the cairn stood as a memorial to Margaret. However, it was known as Mushat Cairn (with varying spellings), bearing the name of her abuser. Sir Walter Scott’s involvement, despite being a restoration effort, also served to muddy the Cairn’s legacy. For those who knew the story of the cairn, this unassuming pile of rocks brought to mind the names of two men – Mushat and Scott.

That changed in 2024. Sara Sheridan (author of Where Are The Women?), local historian Andy Arthur, and a team of committed activists campaigned for the Cairn’s name to be changed. Their work coincided with a Scottish Government bill aimed at helping to prevent domestic homicides and suicides, to prevent modern versions of Margaret’s tragic story.

The official name of the cairn on Ordnance Survey maps now honours Margaret Hall, not her killer. The cairn has always been Margaret’s. This re-naming makes the cairn a testament to a life cut short rather than a monument to violence.

The present cairn consists of boulders cemented together and was erected in 1823 replacing an earlier cairn which had been removed c.1789. This earlier cairn was formed over several years by the tradition of laying stones on the cairn "in token of the people's abhorrence and reprobation of the deed". It was situated some way to the west of the present cairn with Sir Walter Scott placing it about a furlong to the east of St. Anthony's Chapel. Scott mentions the cairn several times in the novel, The Heart of Midlothian, by siting Jeanie Dean's tryst with the outlaw, George Robertson, at this spot. The site of the so-called Jeanie Deans Cottage can also be seen in Holyrood Park at the south end of St. Leonards Bank.

=== St Margaret's Well ===
The medieval well house of St Margaret's Well which was originally at Meadowbank, Restalrig was relocated just north of Salisbury Crags in 1860.

A plaque above the well informs:

"This unique Well House dates from the late 15th Century. It originally stood at Restalrig, close to the Church, and its design is a miniature copy of St. Triduana's Aisle there. In 1860 it was removed from its first site, which was then encroached upon by a railway depot, and was reconstructed in its present position near a natural spring."

== History ==
=== Royal Volunteer Review ===
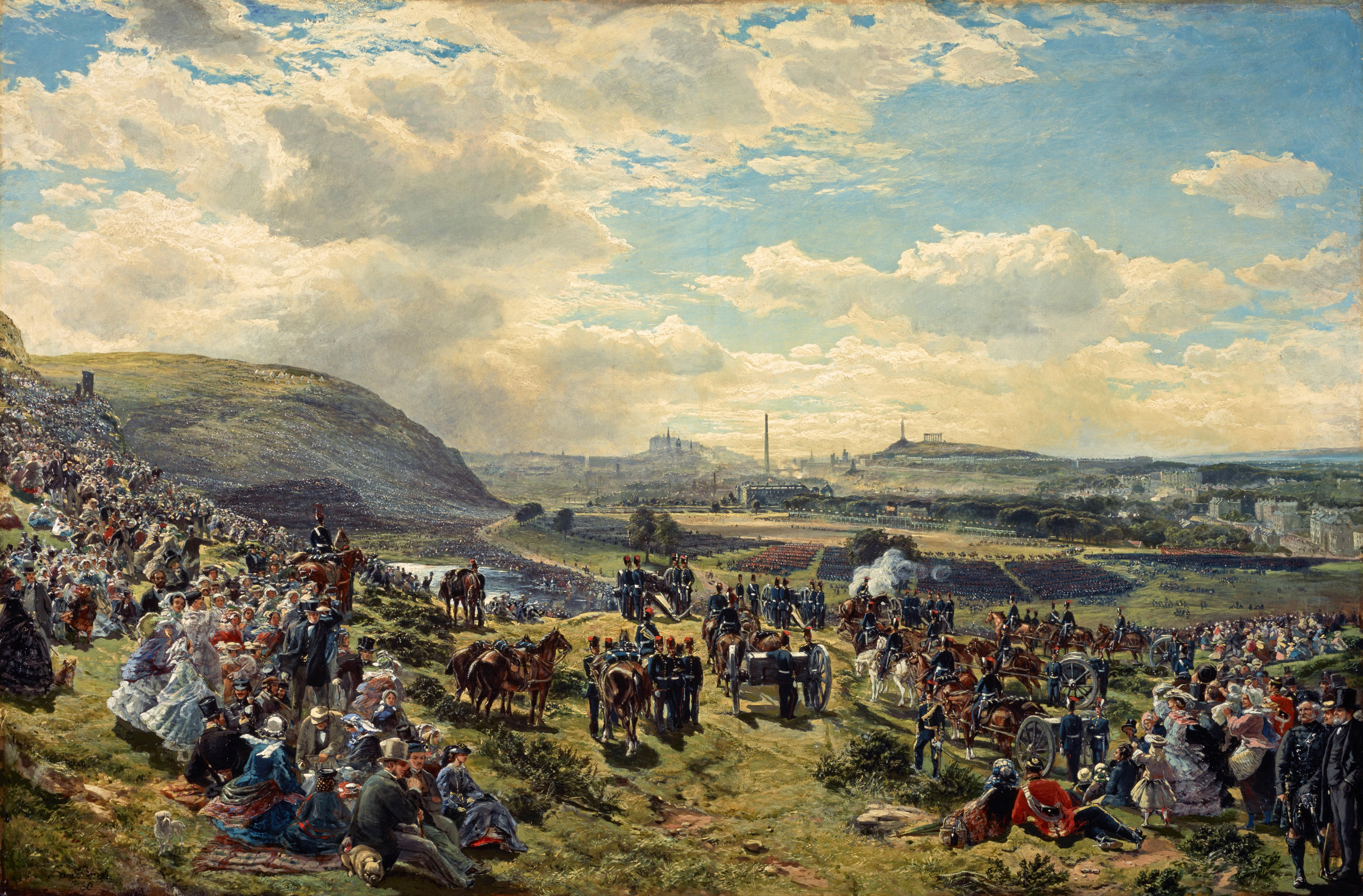
Samuel Bough - Royal Volunteer Review, 7 August 1860

The most dramatic event in the park's history took place on 7 August 1860 when an immense assembly was made of the several Scottish volunteer regiments to appear before Queen Victoria and Prince Albert. The huge number of soldiers were billeted in schools, warehouses etc over the preceding days. These included the larger part of 250 regiments such as the Breadalbane Highlanders led by the aged John Campbell, 2nd Marquess of Breadalbane and Easdale Volunteers. All were under the overall command of Lt Gen George Wetherall.

The "Artists Company" included William McTaggart, John Pettie and Samuel Bough.

The fashion at the time was for ornamental arches along the route to be taken by the monarch, plus other temporary decorations. These were designed by a committee including David Octavius Hill, Joseph Noel Paton and W. B. Johnstone (Keeper of the Scottish National Gallery). Structures included a timber grandstand on the flat ground on the north edge of the park, capable of holding 3000 persons.

The volunteers stood in groups on three sides of the grandstand, mainly along the north edge of the road. Beyond, the lower slopes of Arthur's Seat created a natural amphitheatre from which the non-ticketed observers could gather. These were numbered as 100 to 300,000 which was considerably more than the total population of Edinburgh, but as many volunteers brought their families from up north, is not impossible.

Starting at 3pm Queen Victoria first drove by the 21,000 volunteers in an open carriage then sat on the "saluting dais" at the front of the grandstand. The Ross-shire Buffs provided the pipers for the ceremony. The soldiers then marched by the dais, saluting in waves as they were opposite the Queen. This took almost two hours. After readopting their original positions a unified general salute was made, followed by three cheers for the Queen. With the crowd then joining the cheer, the huge volume is said to have spooked multiple horses, upon which the various officers were mounted, and there was temporary confusion.

The parade officially ended at 6pm but the crowds did not fully disperse until sunset. Official thanks were conveyed to the regiments by Adjutant General James Yorke Scarlett.

A second major review took place in August 1881 with 44,000 parading under command of Gen Alastair Macdonald and a third in 1905.

=== 1970 Commonwealth Games ===
The park hosted the 1970 British Commonwealth Games cycling road race, which featured 31 circuits over 102 miles and included climbs and a route through the Queen's Palace Gardens at the Palace of Holyroodhouse.

== Road network ==
Up until 1844, no metalled road existed around the park. The road network in the park today is a product of Prince Albert's reforms in 1844, which added the circular Victoria Road, later called The Queen's Drive.

The roads in Holyrood Park are not part of the City of Edinburgh road network. They are managed through Historic Environment Scotland (HES) as a 'property in care'. HES receives no direct funding for the upkeep of the park roads.

=== Road closures ===
HES has the authority to close most roads to motor vehicles when required or requested. HES may open or close roads at any time in the interest of safety or maintenance, or to facilitate organised events.

All roads in the park are closed to vehicles every Saturday and Sunday, with varying summer and winter hours and access to Broad Pavement, Duddingston, and Meadowbank car parks maintained. The road network is also closed for many events and holidays during the year: Christmas, Boxing Day, New Years Day, Edinburgh Marathon, marches etc.

To help close the roads, there are gates at the five motor vehicle entrances: Dukes Walk (north east), Holyrood Gait (north west), Horse Wynd (north west), Holyrood Park Road (south west) and Old Church Lane (south east).

During the COVID-19 lockdowns, the High Road was closed to motor vehicles at all times. This was at first due to the annual toad migration in March and early April, but HES continued the road closure after the toad migration ended. The High Road is now closed to motor vehicles except daytime on Tuesdays, Wednesdays, and Thursdays and for the annual toad migration.

Since March 2026 the Low Road to Duddingston has been closed to vehicular traffic due to potential rock fall from Samson's Ribs.

=== Regulations ===
As a royal park, Holyrood Park is protected under the framework of the Parks Regulation Act 1872 the Parks Regulation (Amendment) Act 1926 and the Parks Regulation (Amendment) Act 1974, the Holyrood Park Regulations 1971 and subsequent amendments.

Holyrood Park Regulations 1971
- Statutory Instrument
- Parliament of the United Kingdom
- Citation: SI 1971/593

Dates
- Made: 26 March 1971
- Commencement: 1 May 1971
Other legislation
Repeals/revokes	Holyrood Park Regulations 1959 (SI 1959/302); Holyrood Park (First Amendment) Regulations 1960 (SI 1960/1236); Holyrood Park (Second Amendment) Regulations 1967 (SI 1967/1935)
Made under	Park Regulation (Amendment) Act 1926

Text of statute as originally enacted

The Holyrood Park Regulations 1971 (SI 1971/593) prohibit:

- soliciting passengers with a hackney carriage;
- driving or using any vehicle designed to seat more than seven passengers (in addition to the driver), or constructed or adapted for the purpose of any trade or business or as a dwelling; effectively prohibiting commercial vehicles.

Holyrood Park Amendment Regulations 2001
- Statutory Instrument
- Scottish Parliament
- Citation: SSI 2001/405

Dates
- Made: 5 November 2001
- Commencement: 6 November 2001
Other legislation
Made under	Parks Regulations (Amendment) Act 1926

Text of statute as originally enacted

Holyrood Park Amendment Regulations 2005
- Statutory Instrument
- Scottish Parliament
- Citation: SSI 2005/15

Dates
- Made: 12 January 2005
- Commencement: 14 January 2005
Other legislation
Made under	Parks Regulations (Amendment) Act 1926

Text of statute as originally enacted

The Holyrood Park Amendment Regulations 2005 (SSI 2005/15) instituted parking charges at Broad Pavement car park.

Coaches require the written permission of the Scottish Ministers to use Holyrood Park. Coach drivers must obtain a permit which is valid for 12 calendar months. Coach permits are only valid while coaches are carrying passengers. Empty coaches travelling through the park are classed as commercial vehicles and liable to a fixed penalty notice. Permits only allow coaches access to The Queen's Drive and High Road and do not allow access to the Low Road between Holyrood Park Road (Commonwealth Pool) and Old Church Lane (Duddingston Village).

=== Traffic reduction ===
In 2011, Historic Scotland started a campaign to reduce traffic passing through Holyrood Park. Martin Gray, Historic Scotland's Royal Parks Visitor Services Manager, noted increasing motor traffic in the park:

"Holyrood Park is a unique green space in the heart of the city. The Park's location makes it very accessible and popular to visitors, but developments around the park have resulted in increasing levels of through-traffic, commercial vehicle misuse and speeding. Large and heavy vehicles cause accelerated wearing of roads surfaces and damage kerbs and traffic islands. They also pose a risk to park users and wildlife who enjoy the use of the Park."

=== Cycling infrastructure ===
There is a cycle path on the south side of Queen's Drive from St Margaret's Loch to Broad Pavement car park, but the path is shared between pedestrians and cyclists between Broad Pavement car park and the roundabout by the Royal Commonwealth Pool entrance to the park.

== See also ==
- Holyrood (disambiguation)
