= Nicol Muschat =

Scottish physician (1695–1721)

Nicol Muschat (1695–1721) was a Scottish physician, remembered for his murder of his teenage wife, Margaret Hall (1704-1720).

== Life ==
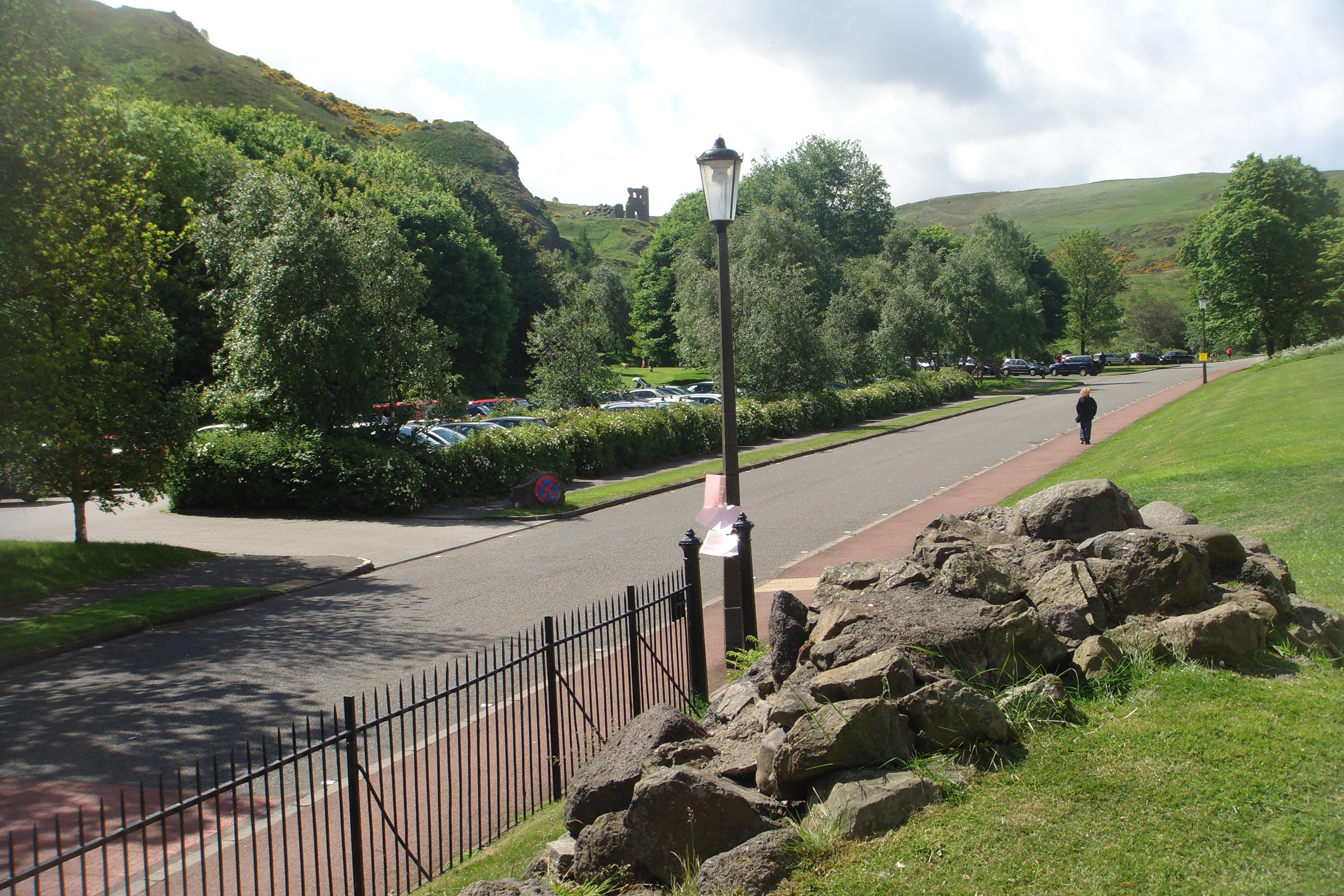
Muschat's Cairn in Holyrood Park

He was born in 1695, possibly at Boghall Farmhouse on Biggar Road just south-west of Edinburgh, as he is often referred to as "Muschat of Boghall". His father died when he was young, and he was raised by his mother; the family appears to have been relatively wealthy.

While studying medicine at Edinburgh University he resided in the top floor of the Auld Cameronian Meeting House on the east side of Blackfriars Wynd just off the Royal Mile.

In 1715, he served as assistant to Dr Thomas Napier in Alloa on the opposite side of the Firth of Forth. In less than a year he returned to Edinburgh where he lodged on Anchor Close and took a job as a shop assistant nearby on the Royal Mile.

In 1719 a customer called Margaret Hall caught his eye. She was the daughter of a wealthy wine merchant further up the street at Castlehill. He married her on 5 September 1719, three weeks after meeting her. They lived some weeks with her parents, then found their own lodgings on St Mary's Wynd (now called St Mary Street).

Nicol had three friends in Edinburgh with whom he both confided his plans and sought their aid: James Campbell of Burnbank (the storekeeper at Edinburgh Castle); James Muschat (his cousin); and James' wife, Grizel. They made three failed attempts on her life (according to his own confession at trial). Firstly, being given 20 guineas by Muschat, they attempted to murder her on Dickson's Close. Secondly, in November 1719, Campbell of Burnbank was offered the immediate repayment of Muschat's debt of 900 merks, to fabricate some crime against his wife, but this did not materialise. Thirdly his brother James and his wife were minded to poison her, but although administering mercury in a glass of brandy, she did not die.

A scheme to drown her in a ditch at the side of Easter Road after a trip to Leith was abandoned. Grizel, frustrated by the lack of payment, due to the failed schemes, pressed the men to continue with their murder plans.

Finally, on 17 October 1720, Muschat had been drinking with James until 7 pm and returned to his house on St Mary's Wynd where Grizel sat with Margaret. He invented a story of wishing to walk to Duddingston and they started walking down The Canongate, leaving James and Grizel in his house. Margaret started crying in St Anne's Yards, just east of Holyrood, suspecting something afoot. He declared if she did not accompany him to Duddingston, he would never speak to her again. They reached a point on the north edge of Holyrood Park then highly distant from any house. Here he slit her throat and left her. He returned home to confess the crime to his brother.

Margaret's body was found around 10 am on the following day. She was easily identified and Nicol went into hiding in Leith where he tried to gain passage on a ship to Europe. Meanwhile, Grizel, worrying about her own potential prosecution, revealed Nicol's location to the town guard whilst seeking indemnity against prosecution for herself and her husband. She led the guard to his whereabouts in Leith, and Nicol was arrested. Grizel received a reward from the town council for this act. He confessed all, including the earlier failed plans. He was held at the Tolbooth Prison. He was hanged in the Grassmarket on 6 January 1721.

James and Grizel Muschat escaped all punishment and further turned King's evidence against James Campbell. Campbell was tried in March for "art and part" (aiding and abetting) in the crimes. He was sentenced to transportation for life to the West Indies as a slave on the plantations.

== Memorial ==
Local people raised a stone cairn in 1721. The original cairn was removed in 1789 during improvements to the park, but was rebuilt in 1823 a few metres east of the original site. The 19th century cairn was around 2 meters (6.6 feet) in diameter and 2 m tall, and appears to have remained intact until the Second World War when it was partially pulled down, thereafter lacking its original height and form. It now remains as a somewhat sprawling stack of stones, and lacks a man-made or purposeful appearance.

The cairn stands opposite the East Lodge at the Meadowbank entrance into Holyrood Park.

== In popular culture ==
In Sir Walter Scott's book The Heart of Midlothian, Muschat's Cairn was the rendezvous point of Butler and Jeanie Deans.
