= Ryme Intrinseca =

Village in Dorset, England

Coordinates: 50.8959°N 2.5965°W

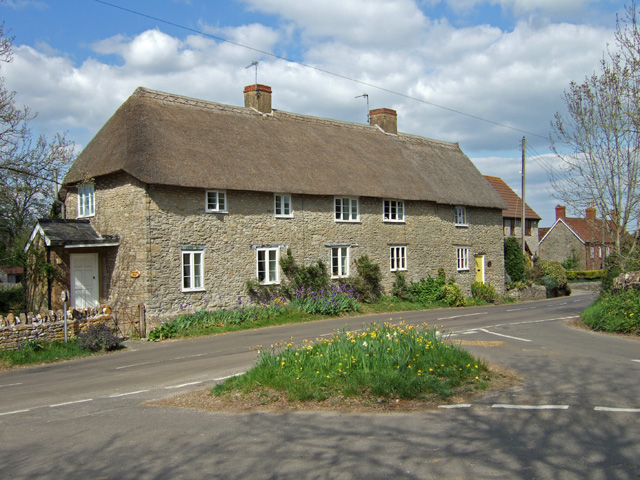
- Cottages in Ryme Intrinseca

- Location within Dorset
- Population: 125 (2021 census)
- OS grid reference: ST582108
- Unitary authority: Dorset
- Ceremonial county: Dorset
- Region: South West
- Country: England
- Sovereign state: United Kingdom
- Post town: SHERBORNE
- Postcode district: DT9
- Dialling code: 01935
- Police: Dorset
- Fire: Dorset and Wiltshire
- Ambulance: South Western
- UK Parliament: West Dorset

Ryme Intrinseca ( /ˌraɪm ɪnˈtrɪnzɪkə/) is a village and civil parish in northwest Dorset, England, 4 miles (6.4 km) south of Yeovil and 1 mile (1.6 km) west of Yetminster. It is sited on a low ridge of cornbrash limestone on the edge of the Blackmore Vale. In the 2021 census the parish had a population of 125.

The church at Ryme Intrinseca, which dates back to the 13th century, is dedicated to St. Hippolytus and there are only two churches dedicated as such in England: cf. St Ippolyts, a village on the southern edge of Hitchin in Hertfordshire. The chancel and nave of the church are basically from the 13th century, but architecturally the most interesting features lie in the unusual 17th-century work which includes the east window and most of the windows in the nave, (including the little trefoil placed high to light the pulpit). Also from the early 17th century is the tower, with its intricate profile caused by the projecting stairway. There is an alms dish in the church which was lost in 1873 and found its way back to Dorset from Bideford in Devon in 1938.

Ryme once constituted a separate liberty, containing only the parish itself.

== Toponymy ==
Ryme derives from "rim", in the sense of "edge", "border" or "ridge", and may refer to the village's situation on a ridge between two tributaries of the Yeo vale, or to the contrast between the vale and the steep rise of the Dorset Downs to the south.

Intrinseca means "within". John Hutchins suggests that the name arose in the 15th century, when the manor of Ryme was in the possession of John Tiptoft, who acquired parcels of land throughout Dorset, notably Hallynges in Long Bredy. Hutchins therefore says that Ryme Intrinseca (or In Ryme) refers to land within Ryme manor, in contrast to Ryme Extrinsecus (or Out Ryme) referring to the additional possessions. The latter name is now extinct.

== Demographics ==
Census population of Ryme Intrinseca parish
| Census | Population | Female | Male | Households | Source |
|---|---|---|---|---|---|
| 1921 | 152 | | | | |
| 1931 | 149 | | | | |
| 1951 | 123 | | | | |
| 1961 | 129 | | | | |
| 1981 | 160 | | | | |
| 1991 | 130 | | | | |
| 2001 | 130 | 65 | 65 | 57 | |
| 2011 | 115 | 62 | 53 | 57 | |
| 2021 | 125 | 70 | 55 | 59 | |

== See also ==
- List of liberties in Dorset
