= List of statutory instruments of the United Kingdom, 1971 =

This is an incomplete list of statutory instruments of the United Kingdom in 1971.

== Statutory instruments ==
=== 1-499 ===
- Act of Sederunt (Legal Aid Rules Amendment) 1971 (SI 1971/174)
- Legal Aid (Scotland) (General) Amendment Regulations 1971 (SI 1971/194)
- Lands Tribunal for Scotland Rules 1971 (SI 1971/218)
- Act of Sederunt (Legal Aid Fees) 1971 (SI 1971/219)
- Police Pensions Regulations 1971 (SI 1971/232)
- County Court Funds (Amendment) Rules 1971 (SI 1971/260)
- Act of Sederunt (Legal Aid) (Children) 1971 (SI 1971/287)
- Legal Aid (Scotland) (Children) Regulations 1971 (SI 1971/288)
- Legal Aid (Scotland) (Extension of Proceedings) Regulations 1971 (SI 1971/317)
- Great Ouse River Authority (Littleport and Downham Internal Drainage District) Order 1970 (SI 1971/404)

=== 500-999 ===
- Representation of the People Act 1969 (Commencement No. 2) Order 1971 (SI 1971/544)
- Legal Aid (Scotland) (Children) Amendment Regulations 1971 (SI 1971/554)
- Police Pensions (Amendment) Regulations 1971 (SI 1971/583)
- Holyrood Park Regulations 1971 (SI 1971/593)
- Double Taxation Relief (Taxes on Income) (France) Order 1971 (SI 1971/718)
- Act of Adjournal (Criminal Legal Aid Fees Amendment) 1971 (SI 1971/926)
- Mid Southern Water Order 1971 (SI 1971/968)

=== 1000-1499 ===
- Rent Assessment Committees (England and Wales) Regulations 1971 (SI 1971/1065)
- Courts Act 1971 (Commencement) Order 1971 (SI 1971/1151)
- Crown Court Rules 1971 (SI 1971/1292)
- Police Pensions (Amendment) (No. 2) Regulations 1971 (SI 1971/1327)
- Indictment Rules 1971 (SI 1971/1253)
- Police Pensions (Amendment) (No. 3) Regulations 1971 (SI 1971/1466)

=== 1500-1999 ===
- "Zebra" Pedestrian Crossings Regulations 1971 (SI 1971/1524)
- The Building (Seventh Amendment) Regulations 1971 (SI 1971/1600)
- Wireless Telegraphy (Control of Interference from Radio Frequency Heating Apparatus) Regulations 1971 (SI 1971/1675)
- Temples Order 1971 (SI 1971/1732)
- Act of Sederunt (Legal Aid) (Children) (Amendment) 1971 (SI 1971/1795)
- Act of Sederunt (Legal Aid Rules and Legal Aid Fees Amendment) 1971 (SI 1971/1796)
- Friendly Societies (Fees) Order 1971 (SI 1971/1900)
- Legal Aid (Scotland) (Extension of Proceedings) (No. 2) Regulations 1971 (SI 1971/1912)
- Legal Aid (Scotland) (General) Amendment (No. 2) Regulations 1971 (SI 1971/1914)

=== 2000-2499 ===
- Extradition (Hijacking) Order 1971 (SI 1971/2102)
- Extradition (Tokyo Convention) Order 1971 (SI 1971/2103)

== See also ==
- List of statutory instruments of the United Kingdom
