= John Michel =

British Army officer (1804–1886)

Field Marshal The Right Honourable Sir John Michel GCB
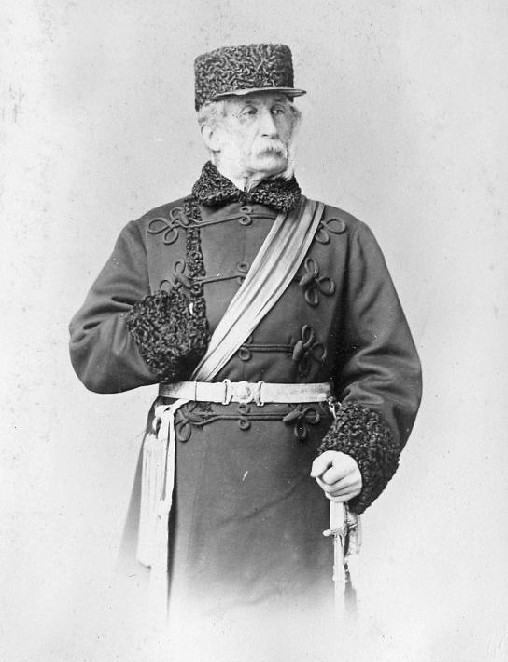
- Born: 1 September 1804; Dewlish House, Dorset
- Died: 23 May 1886 (aged 81); Dewlish House, Dorset
- Military career
- Allegiance: (United Kingdom of Great Britain and Ireland) United Kingdom
- Branch: British Army
- Service years: 1823–1880
- Rank: Field Marshal
- Commands: 6th Regiment of Foot; Commander of British Troops in China and Hong Kong; Commander of the British Troops in Canada; Commander-in-Chief of Ireland
- Conflicts: Eighth Xhosa War; Crimean War; Indian Mutiny; Second Opium War; Fenian raids
- Awards: Knight Grand Cross of the Order of the Bath; Order of the Medjidie, Second Class (Ottoman Empire)

Field Marshal Sir John Michel GCB (1 September 1804 – 23 May 1886) was a British Army officer. He commanded the 6th Regiment of Foot during the Eighth Xhosa War in 1851 and served as Chief of Staff of the British Army's Turkish contingent during the Crimean War in 1854 before transferring to India where he commanded the Malwa Field Force which pursued Tatya Tope in the aftermath of the Indian Mutiny. He then commanded the 1st Division at the Battle of Taku Forts in August 1860 during the Second Opium War and took part in the burning of the Old Summer Palace at Peking in October 1860 as a reprisal for the torture and murder of British prisoners before being appointed Commander of British Troops in China and Hong Kong in 1861. He later commanded the forces in British North America playing a key role in the organization of the militia volunteers in resistance to the Fenian raids invasions in 1866. His last appointment was as Commander-in-Chief of Ireland in 1875.

Michel was also an English cricketer with amateur status.

== Military career ==
Born the son of Lieutenant-General John Michel and Anne Michel (née Fane), Michel was educated at Eton College and commissioned into the 57th Regiment of Foot on 3 April 1823. He transferred to the 27th Regiment of Foot a few months later, then to the 60th Regiment of Foot on 6 November 1823 and then to the 64th Regiment of Foot in Gibraltar on 24 November 1823. He was promoted to lieutenant on 28 April 1825, to captain in an unattached company on 12 December 1826 and to captain the 64th Foot on 15 February 1827.

Michel was associated with Marylebone Cricket Club (MCC) and made his debut in 1831. He played for the Gentlemen in the Gentlemen v Players match.

Michel attended the Royal Military College, Sandhurst in 1832 passing out as a staff officer the following year. He returned to the 64th Foot before transferring to the 3rd Regiment of Foot in Bengal on 20 February 1835 and becoming Aide-de-Camp to General Sir Henry Fane there later that year. Promoted to major in the 6th Regiment of Foot on 6 March 1840, he became commanding officer of the 6th Foot with the rank of lieutenant colonel on 15 April 1842.

Michel was deployed to South Africa in 1847, where he commanded his Regiment at the Battle of Waterkloof in March 1851 and the Battle of Mount Chaco in December 1851 during the Eighth Xhosa War. Promoted to brevet colonel on 20 June 1854, he became an Inspecting Field Officer for the recruiting districts on 1 October 1854 and then Chief of Staff of the British Army's Turkish contingent serving in the Crimean War with the local rank of major-general on 27 March 1855. After returning to South Africa again with the local rank of major-general on 24 July 1856 to deal with attacks by the cattle-killing movement, he was transferred to India with the local rank of major-general on 7 August 1857 and commanded the Malwa Field Force which pursued Tatya Tope in the aftermath of the Indian Mutiny. He was promoted to the substantive rank of major-general on 26 October 1858.

Michel became Commander of the 1st Division and fought at the Battle of Taku Forts in August 1860 during the Second Opium War. He took part in the burning of the Old Summer Palace at Peking in October 1860 as a reprisal for the torture and murder of British prisoners before being appointed Commander of British Troops in China and Hong Kong in 1861.

Michel became Commander of the British Troops in Canada in British North America with the local rank of lieutenant-general on 25 April 1865, succeeding Lieutenant-General Sir William Williams. In this capacity, Michel played a key role in the organization of the militia volunteers in resistance to the Fenian raids invasions in 1866. He was also a strong supporter of the Ottawa–French River navigation route advocated by Casimir Gzowski. Promoted to the substantive rank of lieutenant-general on 25 June 1866 and to full general on 28 March 1874, he became the Commander-in-Chief, Ireland in 1875; in this capacity his social skills and ample means made him very popular. He returned from Ireland on 1 October 1880. He also became colonel of the 86th Regiment of Foot (later the 2nd Battalion the Royal Irish Rifles).

Promoted to field marshal on 27 March 1886, Michel retired to Dewlish House in Dorset where he died on 23 May 1886.

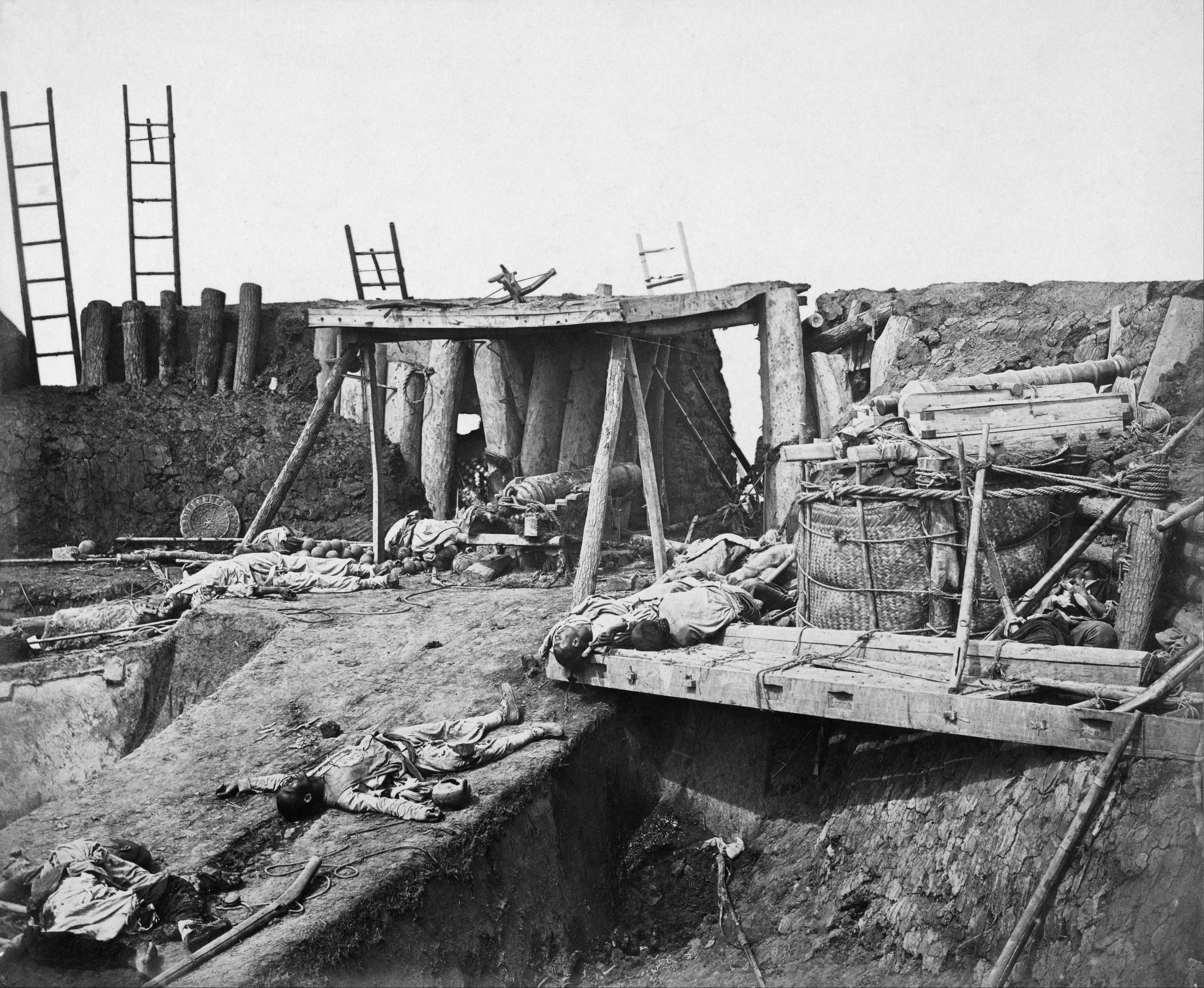
The Taku Forts, just after the battle

== Honours ==
Michel's honours included:

- Knight Grand Cross of the Order of the Bath (GCB) – 20 May 1871 (KCB – 22 March 1859; CB – 30 May 1853)
- Order of the Medjidie, Second Class (Ottoman Empire) – 2 March 1858

== Family ==
In May 1838 Michel married Louise Anne Churchill and together they went on to have two sons and three daughters.

== Sources ==
- Heathcote, Tony (1999). The British Field Marshals, 1736–1997: A Biographical Dictionary. Barnsley: Leo Cooper. ISBN 0-85052-696-5.

Military offices
Preceded by Sir James Grant	Commander of British Troops in China and Hong Kong; 1861–1862	Succeeded by Sir Charles Staveley
Preceded by Sir William Fenwick Williams	Commander of the British Troops in Canada; 1865–1867	Succeeded by Sir Charles Ash Windham
Preceded by Lord Sandhurst	Commander-in-Chief, Ireland; 1875–1880	Succeeded by Sir Thomas Steele
Honorary titles
Preceded by Lord James Hay	Colonel of the 86th (Royal County Down) Regiment of Foot; 1862–1881	Succeeded by Amalgamated to form the Royal Irish Rifles
