= Temples Order 1971 =

British order in Council

- Statutory Instrument
- Parliament of the United Kingdom
- Citation: SI 1971/1732

Dates
- Made: 27 October 1971
- Laid before Parliament: 2 November 1971
- Commencement: 15 November 1971

Other legislation
- Made under: London Government Act 1963

Text of the The Temples Order 1971 as in force today (including any amendments) within the United Kingdom, from legislation.gov.uk.

The Temples Order 1971 (SI 1971/1732) is an order in Council in the United Kingdom, setting out the powers of the Inner Temple and Middle Temple to act as local authorities.

The order provides that local authority functions exercised by London borough councils under the London Government Act 1963 can be exercised by the Sub-Treasurer of the Inner Temple and the Under Treasurer of the Middle Temple in their respective areas except in connection with housing. The order also gives the Common Council of the City of London certain powers in relation to the Temples including powers in relation to historical buildings. The order was made at Buckingham Palace under powers granted by section 82 of the London Government Act 1963.

The remaining local authority functions of the Temples include:

- planning (excluding development plans and listed buildings);
- public health and safety; and
- refuse collections

The Sub-Treasurer of the Inner Temple and the Under-Treasurer of the Middle Temple are subject to the Freedom of Information Act 2000 in respect of the functions they carry out as local authorities.
