= Compton Valence =

Village and civil parish in Dorset, England

Coordinates: 50.7373°N 2.5772°W

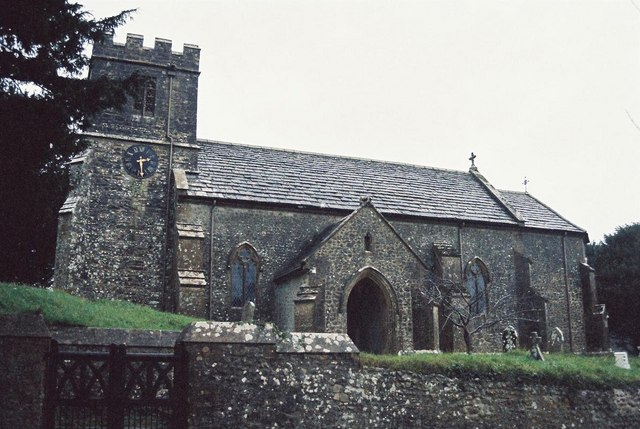
- Parish church of St Thomas à Becket

- Location within Dorset
- Population: 50
- OS grid reference: SY594932
- Unitary authority: Dorset
- Ceremonial county: Dorset
- Region: South West
- Country: England
- Sovereign state: United Kingdom
- Post town: Dorchester
- Postcode district: DT2
- Police: Dorset
- Fire: Dorset and Wiltshire
- Ambulance: South Western
- UK Parliament: West Dorset

Compton Valence is a small village and civil parish in the county of Dorset in southern England. It lies approximately 7 miles (11 km) west of the county town Dorchester. It is sited at the head of a narrow valley, formed by a small tributary of the River Frome, and is surrounded by the hills of the Dorset Downs, which has led to it having been described as "a pocket of habitation in the downs." Dorset County Council estimate that in 2013 the population of the parish was 50.

== Parish church ==
The parish church has a 15th-century tower, but the rest of the building was rebuilt in 1838–1839 by Benjamin Ferrey. The church is a Grade II* listed building.

Architectural guidebooks also discuss the church and its 19th-century rebuilding. A video feature on the village church draws attention to the Gothic Revival character of the rebuilding and discusses the church organ and its restoration, presenting the building as an example of Victorian medievalising design that can appear older than it is.

== Geology ==
The locality is known to geologists for the 'Compton Valence Dome', arising from the local upcoming of the chalk strata. The core of this geological structure has been eroded to reveal the older underlying Middle Jurassic mudstones. It lies astride the Wynford Fault and is thought to arise from a complex intersection of faults in the area.

== Local note ==
Compton Valence is known locally for its display of snowdrops, which fill the road verges in late winter.

== Ownership ==
In the 19th century, the parish is described as being held largely as a single estate, associated with the Williams family of Bridehead (Littlebredy), who also funded aspects of the 19th-century rebuilding of the parish church. Dorset Life also reports that in the 1950s much of the parish, including the church and village hall, was bought from Sir Philip Williams by Wynford Eagle farmer William Noel (“Tim”) Chick, with the Chick family continuing to farm in the parish.

Estate records for the Bridehead estate (including material relating to Compton Valence) are held by the Dorset History Centre.

== Local finds ==
A notable object recorded from the parish is a Tudor-period silver-gilt mariner’s (boatswain’s) whistle incorporating a set of grooming/toilet implements, dated to c. 1500–1600 and recorded as a findspot from Compton Valence, Dorset. The find was reported as Treasure (Portable Antiquities Scheme / Treasure number DOR-465CA6 / 2021T415) and was acquired by the British Museum through the Treasure Act in February 2025; it is catalogued as museum number 2025,8007.1. In curator’s comments, the British Museum notes comparators for whistles combined with grooming implements among high-status 16th-century objects (including examples recorded in inventories of Henry VIII), but adds that—given the absence of primary evidence for silver or silver-gilt examples of this specific type—a royal or elite ownership context for the Compton Valence find is considered unlikely; it is therefore interpreted as a silver-gilt object emulating elite gold examples for a wider market.
