= Hermitage, Dorset =

Village and civil parish in Dorset, England

Coordinates: 50.859°N 2.504°W

Hermitage
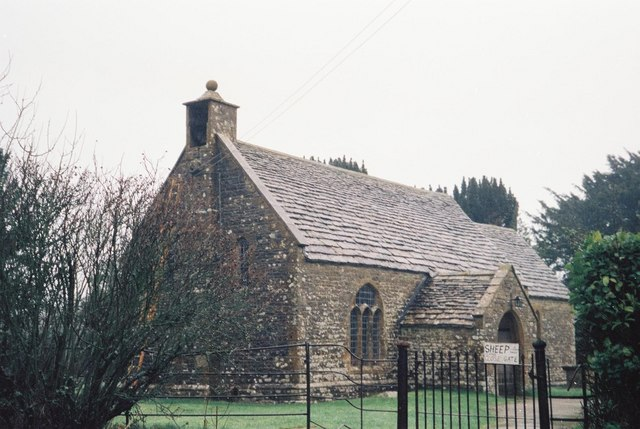
- Parish church of St Mary

- Location within Dorset
- Population: 70
- OS grid reference: ST647069
- Unitary authority: Dorset
- Ceremonial county: Dorset
- Region: South West
- Country: England
- Sovereign state: United Kingdom
- Police: Dorset
- Fire: Dorset and Wiltshire
- Ambulance: South Western

Hermitage is a small village and civil parish in the county of Dorset in southern England. It is situated in the Blackmore Vale under the scarp of the Dorset Downs, 6 miles (9.7 km) south of the town of Sherborne. Dorset County Council's latest (2013) estimate of the parish population is 70.

Augustinian monks once had a hermitage here (also known as the Blackmoor Priory Hermitage), whence the name of the village, but they abandoned the site in the 14th or 15th century. The Lady's Well which they used still remains, on the edge of woodland a short distance from the village.
