= Liberty (division) =

Former English division

Liberties Act 1836 (Note: The citation of this act by this short title was authorised by section 1 of, and the first schedule to, the Short Titles Act 1896. Due to the repeal of those provisions it is now authorised by section 19(2) of the Interpretation Act 1978.)
- Act of Parliament
- Parliament of the United Kingdom
- Long title: An Act for extinguishing the Secular Jurisdiction of the Archbishop of York and the Bishop of Ely in certain Liberties in the Counties of York, Nottingham, and Cambridge.
- Citation: 6 & 7 Will. 4. c. 87
- Territorial extent: United Kingdom

Dates
- Royal assent: 17 August 1836
- Commencement: 17 August 1836 (Note: Section 1.)
- Repealed: 27 May 1976
Other legislation
Amended by	Liberty of Ely Act 1837; Coroners Act 1887; Statute Law Revision Act 1890; Supreme Court of Judicature (Consolidation) Act 1925; Justices of the Peace Act 1949; Statute Law Revision Act 1963
Repealed by	Statute Law (Repeals) Act 1976

Status: Repealed

Text of statute as originally enacted

A liberty was an English and Irish geographic unit originating in the Middle Ages, traditionally defined as an area in which regalian right was revoked and where the land was held by a mesne lord (i.e., an area in which rights reserved to the king had been devolved into private hands). It later became a unit of local government administration.

Liberties were areas of widely variable extent which were independent of the usual system of hundreds and boroughs for a number of different reasons, usually to do with peculiarities of tenure. Because of their tenurial rather than geographical origin, the areas covered by liberties could either be widely scattered across a county or limited to an area smaller than a single parish: an example of the former is Fordington Liberty, and of the latter, the Liberty of Waybayouse, both in Dorset.

In northern England, the liberty of Bowland was one of the larger tenurial configurations covering some ten manors, eight townships and four parishes under the sway of a single feudal lord, the Lord of Bowland, whose customary title is Lord of the Fells. Up until the Tenures Abolition Act 1660 (12 Cha. 2. c. 24), such lords would have been lords paramount.

The Liberties Act 1836 (6 & 7 Will. 4. c. 87) ended the temporal jurisdiction of the Archbishop of York and the Bishop of Ely in several liberties, and the Liberties Act 1850 (13 & 14 Vict. c. 105) permitted the merging of liberties in their counties. By 1867, only a handful remained: Ely, Havering-atte-Bower, St Albans, Peterborough, Ripon and Haverfordwest. St Albans was subsequently joined to the county of Hertfordshire in 1875.

The Local Government Act 1888 (51 & 52 Vict. c. 41) led to the ending of the special jurisdictions in April 1889: the Isle of Ely and Soke of Peterborough became administrative counties, while the three remaining liberties were united to their surrounding counties.

== Inner and Middle Temples ==
Inner Temple and Middle Temple, which occupy an area in London known as The Temple, describe themselves as liberties based on letters patent from 1608 and retain a large degree of independence to the present day. They are extra-parochial areas, historically not governed by the City of London Corporation, and are today regarded as local authorities for most purposes.

They are also outside the ecclesiastical jurisdiction of the Bishop of London. They geographically fall within the boundaries of the City of London, but can be thought of as independent enclaves.

The local government functions of the Inner and Middle Temples are allocated by the Temples Order 1971 (SI 1971/1732) which provides that the Sub-Treasurer of the Inner Temple and the Under-Treasurer of the Middle Temple may exercise any function of an Inner London borough defined in either of ss.1(4) or 6 London Government Act 1963 which is not expressly excepted by an act or order. Exceptions in the Temples Order 1971 include various matters associated with housing, planning, public welfare and health; the effect is usually to direct such excepted powers or responsibilities to the Common Council of the City of London. The City of London Police have policed the Temples since 1857 by consent rather than by imposition.

== List of liberties ==
- Allertonshire
- Alverstoke Liberty
- Beaulieu Liberty
- Bedford Corporation
- Bentley Liberty
- Liberty of Berrick Prior
- Bircholt Franchise and Barony
- Blackfriars, London
- Bolingbroke Soke
- Bowland, Forest of Bowland, Forest and Liberty of Bowland
- Breamore Liberty
- Liberty of Brickendon (Hertfordshire)
- Precinct of Bridewell
- Bridgnorth Liberty
- Cawood, Wistow and Otley
- Chichester
- Liberty of the Clink
- Coldharbour, City of London
- Dibden Liberty
- Doncaster Soke
- List of liberties in Dorset
- The Liberties, Dublin
- Liberty of Durham
- Earley, Berkshire
- East Medina Liberty
- East Smithfield Liberty
- Ely Place Liberty
- Ely Rents Liberty
- Ennerdale, Ennerdale, Forest and Liberty and Bailiwick of Ennerdale
- Everleigh, Wiltshire
- Liberty of Glasshouse Yard
- Grandpont, Oxford
- Grantham Soke
- Liberty of Hallamshire
- Havant Liberty
- Hatton Garden Liberty
- Haverfordwest
- Royal Liberty of Havering
- Franchise of Hexhamshire
- Horncastle Soke
- Liberty of Howdenshire
- Ipswich
- Liberty of Ely
- Kingswood Liberty, Surrey
- Liberty of Langbaurgh/ Cleveland
- Langport Liberty
- Lodsworth
- The Minories
- Liberty of the Mint, Southwark
- Soke of Mountsorrel, Leicestershire
- Liberty of Norton Folgate
- Old Artillery Ground Liberty (part of the Liberties of the Tower of London)
- Orton, Staffordshire, a liberty in Wombourne Parish
- Oxford
- Soke of Peterborough
- Pevensey Lowey
- Liberties of Priorsdale, Alston Moor
- Portsmouth and Portsea Island Liberty
- Liberty of Redesdale
- Richmondshire
- Liberty of Ripon
- Liberty of the Rolls
- Romney Marsh Liberty
- Liberty of Rufford
- Ryme Intrinseca
- Liberty of St Albans
- Liberty of St John, Midhurst
- St Martin's le Grand
- Liberty of the Savoy (Liberty of the Duchy of Lancaster)
- Liberty of Saint Edmund
- Precinct of St Katharine
- Liberty of Saffron Hill
- Isle of Sheppey Liberty
- Shrewsbury Liberty
- Slaidburn, Manor and Liberty of Slaidburn
- Liberty of the Soke, Winchester
- Borough of Southwark
- Southwell and Scrooby
- Stoborough Liberty
- Lowey of Tonbridge
- Tower division, Liberties of the Tower of London
- Liberty of Trysull
- Liberty of Tynedale
- Tynemouthshire
- Wells St Andrew
- Wenlock Franchise
- West Medina Liberty
- Liberty of Westminster (1585–1900)
- The Liberty of Westover or West Stour
- Whitefriars, London
- Whitby Strand Liberty
- Wicklaw Hundreds, East Suffolk
- Wombourne Liberty
- York

== Ireland ==
The term "liberty" was used in Ireland after the Norman conquest.

- Liberty of Kerry, created in 1329
- Liberty of Leinster; later divided into the liberties of Wexford, Kilkenny, Carlow and Kildare
- Liberty of Meath; later divided into the liberties of Meath and Trim
- Liberty of Tipperary, also known as a County Palatine, existed 1328-1715
- Liberty of Ulster
- Liberty of the Archbishop of Dublin, which at one time covered much of Dublin city south of the River Liffey

== Prison liberties ==
The term "liberty" was also used in England for a demarcated area in the vicinity of a prison in which convicts could live upon regular payment of fees. Examples include the Liberty of the Fleet in the City, and the Rules of the Bench in Southwark.

== See also ==
- The Liberties, Dublin
- Northern Liberties Township, Pennsylvania
