= List of places in Middlesex =

The historic county of Middlesex, England divided into the six hundreds.

List of the parishes in Middlesex, grouped by hundred, as of 1831.

The historic county of Middlesex was recorded in the Domesday Book as being divided into the six hundreds of Edmonton, Elthorne, Gore, Hounslow (Isleworth in all later records), Ossulstone and Spelthorne, as follows:

Hundred	Parishes	Area (1831) acres
Edmonton	Edmonton (All Saints) • Enfield (St Andrew) • Monken Hadley • South Mimms (St Giles) • Tottenham (All Saints)	31,410
Elthorne	Cowley (St Lawrence) • Cranford (St Dunstan) • Greenford • Hanwell (St Mary) • Harefield (St Mary) • Harlington • Harmondsworth (St Mary) • Hayes (St Mary the Virgin) • Hillingdon • Ickenham (St Giles) • New Brentford • Northolt • Norwood • Perivale (St Mary the Virgin) • Ruislip (St Martin) • Uxbridge Hamlet • West Drayton (St Martin)	35,690
Gore	Edgware (St Margaret) • Great Stanmore (St John) • Harrow on the Hill (St Mary) • Hendon (St Mary) • Kingsbury (St Andrew) • Little Stanmore (St Lawrence) • Pinner (St John)	28,660
Isleworth	Heston (St Leonard) • Isleworth (All Saints) • Twickenham (St Mary the Virgin)	9,280
Ossulstone	Acton (St Mary) • Bethnal Green • Bow • Bromley • Charter House • Chelsea (All Saints) • Chiswick (St Nicholas) • Clerkenwell • Duchy of Lancaster • Ealing (St Mary) • Finchley (St Mary) • Friern Barnet • Fulham (All Saints) • Furnival's Inn • Glasshouse Yard • Gray's Inn • Hackney • Hammersmith (St Paul) • Hampstead (St John) • Holy Trinity Minories • Hornsey • Islington (St Mary) • Kensington (St Mary Abbots) • Liberty of Saffron Hill, Hatton Garden, Ely Rents and Ely Place • Liberty of the Rolls • Limehouse • Lincoln's Inn • Mile End New Town • Mile End Old Town • Norton Folgate • Old Artillery Ground • Old Tower Without • Paddington • Poplar • Precinct of the Savoy • Ratcliffe • Shadwell • Shoreditch • Spitalfields • (St Andrew) Holborn • Staple Inn • St Botolph Aldersgate • St Botolph without Aldgate • St Clement Danes • Stepney (St Dunstan) • (St George) Bloomsbury • St George in the East • St George the Martyr • St Giles in the Fields • St Katharine's by the Tower • St Luke • St Marylebone • St Mary le Strand • Stoke Newington • St Pancras • St Sepulchre • Wapping • West Twyford • Whitechapel • Willesden (St Mary the Virgin) [Links incomplete]	47,950
Spelthorne	Ashford (St Matthew) • East Bedfont (St Mary the Virgin) • Feltham (St Dunstan) • Hampton (St Mary the Virgin) • Hampton Wick (St John) • Hanworth (St George) • Laleham (All Saints) • Littleton (St Mary Magdalene) • Shepperton (St Nicholas) • Staines (St Mary) • Stanwell (St Mary the Virgin) • Sunbury (St Mary the Virgin) • Teddington (St Mary)	23,500

The City of London (i.e., the original ″Square Mile″) was geographically located within Middlesex (and was bounded by the hundred of Ossulstone to the west, north and east) but was essentially independent of the county for most purposes.

== Later development of civil parishes ==
See also List of Middlesex boundary changes. This list includes those areas (marked [L]) which became part of the County of London in 1889. See also List of civil parishes in the County of London in 1891. The list should be comprehensive.

Parish	Created	Abolished	Notes
Acton	Ancient	1965	
Ashford	C15th	1974	Medieval chapelry to Staines, later a civil parish, transferred to Surrey 1965.
Bethnal Green [L]	1743	1965	Church built 1743. Previously it had been a "hamlet" of Stepney parish.
Bloomsbury [L]	1731	1774	
Bow or Stratford-at-Bow [L]	1719	1907	Had been a chapelry of Stepney since the 13th century.
Bromley-by-Bow [L]	1537	1965	Formerly an area in the parish of Stepney. Acquired a chapel 1537.
Charter House [L]	1858	1915	Formerly extra-parochial. Abolished to form Finsbury.
Chelsea [L]	Ancient	1965	
Chiswick	Ancient	1965	
Clerkenwell [L]	Ancient	1915	Abolished to form Finsbury.
Close of the Collegiate Church of St Peter [L]	1858	1922	Formerly extra-parochial.
Cowley	Ancient	1938	Merged into Uxbridge.
Cranford	Ancient	1934	Split between Harlington, and Heston and Isleworth.
Ealing	Ancient	1965	
East Bedfont	Ancient	1965	
Edgware	unknown	1931	Formerly a medieval chapelry to Kingsbury. Merged into Hendon.
Edmonton	Ancient	1965	
Enfield	Ancient	1965	
Feltham	Ancient	1965	
Finchley	Ancient	1965	
Finsbury [L]	1915	1965	
Friern Barnet	Ancient	1965	
Fulham [L]	Ancient	1965	
Furnival's Inn [L]	1858	1930	Formerly extra-parochial.
Glasshouse Yard [L]	1866	1915	Formerly part of St Botolph's Aldersgate lying in Middlesex. Abolished to form Finsbury.
Gray's Inn [L]	1858	1932	Formerly extra-parochial.
Great Stanmore	Ancient	1934	Abolished to form Harrow.
Greenford	Ancient	1926	Merged into Ealing.
Hackney [L]	Ancient	1965	
Hadley	1894	1965	Formerly part of Monken Hadley. Moved to Hertfordshire in 1894.
Hammersmith [L]	1834	1965	Formerly part of the parish of Fulham; a chapel of ease was erected in 1631
Hampstead [L]	C15th	1965	Formerly a medieval chapelry to Hendon.
Hampton	Ancient	1937	
Hampton Wick	1866	1937	Formerly part of Hampton.
Hanwell	Ancient	1926	Merged into Ealing.
Hanworth	Ancient	1965	
Harefield	Ancient	1938	Merged into Uxbridge.
Harlington	Ancient	1965	
Harmondsworth	Ancient	1949	Abolished to form Yiewsley and West Drayton.
Harrow	1934	1965	
Harrow-on-the-Hill	Ancient	1934	Abolished to form Harrow.
Harrow Weald	1894	1934	Abolished to form Harrow.
Hayes	Ancient	1965	
Hendon	Ancient	1965	
Heston	Ancient	1927	Abolished to form Heston and Isleworth.
Heston and Isleworth	1927	1965	
Hillingdon	Ancient	1894	Split into Hillingdon East and West.
Hillingdon East	1894	1938	Merged into Uxbridge.
Hillingdon West	1894	1938	Merged into Uxbridge.
Holy Trinity Minories [L]	1858?	1895	Extra-parochial from the Reformation onwards.
Hornsey	Ancient	1965	
Ickenham	Ancient	1938	Merged into Uxbridge.
Isleworth	Ancient	1927	Abolished to form Heston and Isleworth.
Islington [L]	Ancient	1965	
Kensington [L]	Ancient	1965	
Kingsbury	Ancient	1934	Abolished to form Harrow.
Laleham	C15th	1974	Formerly a medieval chapelry to Staines. Moved to Surrey 1965.
Liberty of the Rolls [L]	1866	1922	Until C15th part of St Dunstan-in-the-West lying in Middlesex, then extra-parochial.
Limehouse [L]	1725	1927	Formerly a hamlet in Stepney parish. Merged back into Stepney.
Lincoln's Inn [L]	1858	1932	Formerly extra-parochial.
Little Stanmore	Ancient	1934	Abolished to form Harrow.
Littleton	Ancient	1974	Moved to Surrey 1965.
Mile End New Town [L]	1866	1921	Formed by the division of Stepney. Merged into Whitechapel.
Mile End Old Town [L]	1866	1927	Formed by the division of Stepney. Merged into Stepney.
Monken Hadley	Ancient	1965	Transferred to Hertfordshire in 1889 along with parts of Enfield and South Mimms.
New Brentford	unknown	1965	Formerly a medieval chapelry (of St Lawrence) in the parish of Hanwell.
Northolt	Ancient	1928	Mostly merged into Ealing, with a small area going to Harrow.
Norton Folgate [L]	1858	1921	Formerly extra-parochial. Merged into Whitechapel.
Norwood (Green)	unknown	1965	Formerly a medieval chapelry in Hayes parish, later a civil parish.
Old Artillery Ground [L]	1858	1921	Formerly extra-parochial. Merged into Whitechapel.
Old Brentford	1894	1965	Formerly a hamlet in the parish of Ealing, gaining its first chapel in 1762.
Old Tower Without [L]	1858	1895	Formerly extra-parochial. Merged into St Botolph without Aldgate.
Paddington [L]	Ancient	1965	
Perivale	Ancient	1926	Merged into Ealing.
Pinner	unknown	1934	Formerly a medieval chapelry to Harrow-on-the-Hill. Abolished to form Harrow.
Poplar [L]	1817	1965	Formerly part of Stepney. Became Poplar Borough parish in 1907.
Precinct of St Katharine by the Tower [L]	1858	1895	Formerly extra-parochial. Merged into St Botolph without Aldgate.
Precinct of the Savoy [L]	1866	1922	Formerly extra-parochial.
Ratcliff [L]	1866	1921	Formed by the division of Stepney. Merged into Limehouse.
Ruislip	Ancient	1965	
Saffron Hill, Hatton Garden, Ely Rents and Ely Place [L]	1866	1930	Formerly extra-parochial.
St Andrew Holborn [L]	Ancient	1907	A City of London parish with a portion in M'sex till 1767 (which was merged into the below).
St Andrew Holborn Above the Bars w St George the Martyr [L]	1767	1930	
St Anne Within the Liberty of Westminster / St Anne Soho [L]	1687	1922	
St Botolph's Aldersgate [L]	Ancient	1907	A City of London parish with a portion in M'sex till 1866 (which became Glasshouse Yard).
St Botolph without Aldgate [L]	Ancient	1921	A City of London parish with a portion in M'sex, which was merged into Whitechapel 1921.
St Clement Danes [L]	Ancient	1922	Abolished to form Westminster.
St Dunstan-in-the-West [L]	Ancient	1907	A City of London parish with a portion in M'sex till C15th (later Liberty of the Rolls).
St George Hanover Square [L]	1724	1922	
St George in the East [L]	1729	1927	Created out of Stepney and merged back into it.
St George the Martyr [L]	1723	1767	Abolished to form St Andrew Holborn Above the Bars with St George the Martyr.
St Giles [L]	Ancient	1774	
St Giles Cripplegate [L]	Ancient	1907	A City of London parish with a portion in M'sex till 1733 (which became St Luke's).
St Giles in the Fields and St George Bloomsbury [L]	1774	1930	
(St John of) Wapping [L]	1694	1921	Created out of Whitechapel. Merged into Limehouse.
St Luke's [L]	1733	1915	Formerly that part of St Giles Cripplegate which lay in Middlesex.
St Martin in the Fields [L]	Ancient	1922	
St Mary le Strand [L]	Ancient	1922	
St Marylebone [L]	Ancient	1965	
St Pancras [L]	Ancient	1965	
St Paul Covent Garden [L]	1645	1922	
St Sepulchre [L]	Ancient	1915	A City of London parish with a portion in Middlesex.
Shadwell [L]	1670	1921	Created out of Stepney. Merged into Limehouse.
Shepperton	Ancient	1974	Moved to Surrey 1965.
Shoreditch [L]	Ancient	1965	
South Hornsey	1894	1900	
South Mimms	Ancient	2023	Now in Hertfordshire. Merged into South Mimms and Ridge 2023.
South Mimms Urban	1896	1965	Created out of South Mimms in 1896 and simultaneously transferred to Hertfordshire.
Southgate	1894	1965	Became a chapelry of Edmonton in 1615.
Spitalfields [L]	1729	1921	Created out of Stepney. Merged into Whitechapel.
Staines	Ancient	1974	Moved to Surrey 1965.
Stanwell	Ancient	1974	Moved to Surrey 1965.
Staple Inn [L]	1858	1930	Formerly extra-parochial.
Stepney [L]	Ancient	1866	Lost area before 1866; remainder divided into Ratcliff, Mile End Old, Mile End New 1866.
Stepney [L]	1927	1965	Merger of Whitechapel, Limehouse, Mile End Old Town and St George in the East
Stoke Newington [L]	Ancient	1965	
Sunbury	Ancient	1974	Moved to Surrey 1965.
Teddington	C13th	1937	Formerly medieval chapelry to Staines.
Tottenham	Ancient	1965	
Tower of London [L]	1858	1901	Formerly extra-parochial, despite church. Merged into St Botolph without Aldgate.
Twickenham	Ancient	1965	
Uxbridge	1866	1965	Formerly medieval chapelry of Hillingdon.
Wealdstone	1894	1934	Abolished to form Harrow.
Wembley	1894	1965	Created out of Harrow-on-the-Hill.
West Drayton	Ancient	1949	Abolished to form Yiewsley and West Drayton.
West Twyford	1858	1926	Formerly an extra-parochial medieval chapelry to no church. Merged into Ealing.
Westminster [L]	1922	1965	
Westminster St James [L]	1685	1922	
Westminster St John [L]	1727	1922	
Westminster (St Margaret) [L]	Ancient	1922	
Whitechapel [L]	c. 1338	1927	Created out of Stepney (formerly a chapelry of that parish). Merged into Stepney.
Willesden	Ancient	1965	
Wood Green	1894	1965	Previously a hamlet in Tottenham parish.
Yiewsley	1894	1949	Previously a hamlet to Hillingdon. Abolished to form Yiewsley and West Drayton.
Yiewsley and West Drayton	1949	1965	

== Medieval parishes ==
The parishes of Middlesex did not alter very much between c. 1250 and 1831, but there were some small changes. Note that the below table also includes chapelries (in italics).

Hundred	Parishes
Edmonton	Edmonton • Enfield • Monken Hadley • South Mimms^{1} • Tottenham
Elthorne	Cowley • Cranford • Greenford • Hanwell (New Brentford) • Harefield • Harlington • Harmondsworth • Hayes (Norwood) • Hillingdon (Uxbridge) • Ickenham • Northolt • Perivale • Ruislip • West Drayton
Gore	Great Stanmore • Harrow on the Hill (Pinner • Tokyngton) • Hendon • Kingsbury (Edgware) • Little Stanmore
Isleworth	Heston • Isleworth • Twickenham
Ossulstone	Acton • Chelsea • Chiswick • Clerkenwell • Ealing • Finchley • Friern Barnet • Fulham • Hackney • Hampstead^{2} • Hornsey (Highgate • Muswell Hill) • Islington • Kensington • Paddington • St Clement Danes • St Giles • St Martin in the Fields • St Marylebone • St Mary le Strand • St Pancras (Kentish Town) • Shoreditch • Stoke Newington • Stepney (Isle of Dogs • Stratford-at-Bow • Whitechapel) • West Twyford^{3} • Westminster • Willesden
Spelthorne	East Bedfont • Feltham • Hampton • Hanworth • Littleton^{4} • Shepperton^{4} • Staines^{4} (Ashford^{4} • Laleham^{4} • Teddington) • Stanwell^{4} • Sunbury^{4}
(City of London)^{5}	St Andrew Holborn • St Botolph Aldersgate • St Botolph without Aldgate • St Dunstan-in-the-West • St Giles Cripplegate • St Sepulchre

^{1}now in Hertfordshire rather than Greater London ^{2}a chapelry to Hendon, in Gore hundred ^{3}a chapelry to no church ^{4}now in Surrey rather than Greater London ^{5}Parish churches in the City of London but with parishes extending into parts of Middlesex; see List of civil parishes in the City of London
