= List of civil parishes in the County of London in 1891 =

This is a list of civil parishes in the County of London, excluding the City of London, on the night of the United Kingdom census, 1891. The total population of this area was 4,194,413.

There were 196 civil parishes in the county at large on this date, of which 80 were entirely outside the City, 112 were entirely within the City, and four were partly within the City.

Parish	District of Metropolis	Poor Law Union	Population
Battersea	None (Vestry)	None (Poor Law Parish)	150,558
Bermondsey	None (Vestry)	None (Poor Law Parish)	84,682
Bethnal Green	None (Vestry)	None (Poor Law Parish)	129,132
Bow	Poplar	Poplar	40,365
Bromley	Poplar	Poplar	70,000
Camberwell	None (Vestry)	None (Poor Law Parish)	235,344
Charlton next Woolwich	Plumstead	Lewisham	11,742
Charterhouse	None	Holborn	136
Chelsea	None (Vestry)	None (Poor Law Parish)	96,253
Clapham	Wandsworth	Wandsworth and Clapham	43,698
Clerkenwell	None (Vestry)	Holborn	66,216
Deptford St Nicholas	Greenwich	Greenwich	6,887
Deptford St Paul	Greenwich	Greenwich	101,286
Eltham	Plumstead	Lewisham	5,682
Fulham	None (Vestry)	Fulham	91,639
Furnival's Inn (part) (Note: Partly in the City of London; total population 121)	None	Holborn	97
Gray's Inn	None	Holborn	253
Greenwich	Greenwich	Greenwich	57,240
Hackney	Hackney	Hackney	198,606
Hammersmith	None (Vestry)	Fulham	97,239
Hampstead	None (Vestry)	None (Poor Law Parish)	68,416
Holborn, St Andrew Above the Bars with St George the Martyr	Holborn	Holborn	26,228
Horsleydown, Southwark St John	St Olave	St Olave	9,812
Islington	None (Vestry)	None (Poor Law Parish)	319,143
Kensington	None (Vestry)	None (Poor Law Parish)	166,308
Kidbrooke	Plumstead	Woolwich	2,298
Lambeth	None (Vestry)	None (Poor Law Parish)	275,203
Lee	Plumstead	Lewisham	16,381
Lewisham	Lewisham	Lewisham	72,272
Limehouse	Limehouse	Stepney	32,202
Lincoln's Inn	None	Holborn	27
Mile End New Town	Whitechapel	Whitechapel	11,303
Mile End Old Town	None (Vestry)	None (Poor Law Parish)	107,592
Minories, Holy Trinity	Whitechapel	Whitechapel	301
Newington	None (Vestry)	St Saviour's	115,804
Norton Folgate	Whitechapel	Whitechapel	1,449
Old Artillery Ground	Whitechapel	Whitechapel	2,138
Paddington	None (Vestry)	None (Poor Law Parish)	117,846
Penge	Lewisham	Croydon	20,375
Plumstead	Plumstead	Woolwich	52,436
Poplar	Poplar	Poplar	56,383
Putney	Wandsworth	Wandsworth and Clapham	17,771
Ratcliff	Limehouse	Stepney	14,928
Rolls, Liberty of the	Strand	Strand	421
Rotherhithe	None (Vestry)	St Olave	39,255
Saffron Hill, Hatton Garden, Ely Rents and Ely Place, Liberty of	Holborn	Holborn	4,506
St Anne Within the Liberty of Westminster	Strand	Westminster	12,317
St Botolph without Aldersgate (part, Glasshouse Yard) (Note: Partly in the City of London; total population 2,440)	Holborn	London City	779
St Botolph without Aldgate	Whitechapel	Whitechapel	2,971
St Clement Danes	Strand	Strand	8,492
St George Hanover Square	None (Vestry)	St George's	78,364
St George in the East	None (Vestry)	None (Poor Law Parish)	45,795
St Giles in the Fields and St George Bloomsbury	St Giles	None (Poor Law Parish)	39,782
St Katherine by the Tower	Whitechapel	Whitechapel	182
St Luke	None (Vestry)	Holborn	42,440
St Martin in the Fields	None (Vestry)	Strand	14,616
St Mary le Strand	Strand	Strand	1,549
St Marylebone	None (Vestry)	None (Poor Law Parish)	142,404
St Pancras	None (Vestry)	None (Poor Law Parish)	234,379
St Paul Covent Garden	Strand	Strand	2,142
St Sepulchre	Holborn	Holborn	1,972
Savoy, Precinct of the	Strand	Strand	201
Shadwell	Limehouse	Stepney	8,123
Shoreditch	None (Vestry)	None (Poor Law Parish)	124,009
Southwark Christchurch	St Saviour's	St Saviour's	13,264
Southwark St George the Martyr	None (Vestry)	St Saviour's	59,712
Southwark St Olave	St Olave	St Olave	2,159
Southwark St Saviour	St Saviour's	St Saviour's	13,913
Southwark St Thomas	St Olave	St Olave	752
Spitalfields	Whitechapel	Whitechapel	22,859
Staple Inn (part) (Note: Partly in the City of London; total population 21)	None	Holborn	18
Stoke Newington	Hackney	Hackney	30,936
Streatham	Wandsworth	Wandsworth and Clapham	42,972
Tooting Graveney	Wandsworth	Wandsworth and Clapham	5,784
Tower of London	Whitechapel	Whitechapel	868
Tower Without, Old	Whitechapel	Whitechapel	65
Wandsworth	Wandsworth	Wandsworth and Clapham	46,717
Wapping	Limehouse	Stepney	2,123
Westminster St James	None (Vestry)	Westminster	24,995
Westminster St Margaret and St John	Westminster	St George's	55,539
Westminster St Peter, Close of the Collegiate Church of	None	St George's	235
Whitechapel (part) (Note: Partly in the City of London; total population 32,326)	Whitechapel	Whitechapel	32,284
Woolwich	None (Vestry)	Woolwich	40,848
