= Strand (UK Parliament constituency) =

Parliamentary constituency in the United Kingdom, 1885–1918

- Former borough constituency for the House of Commons
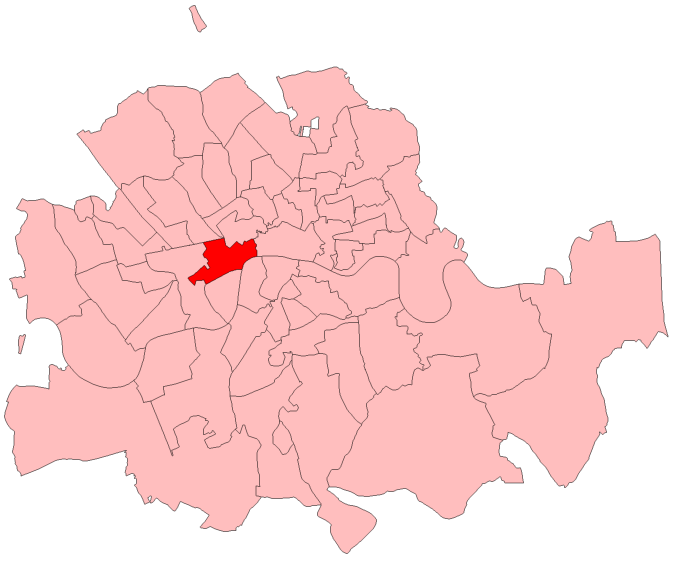
- Strand in London

1885–1918
- Seats: One
- Created from: Westminster
- Replaced by: Westminster Abbey

Strand was a parliamentary constituency in the Strand district of the City of Westminster. It returned one Member of Parliament (MP) to the House of Commons of the Parliament of the United Kingdom.

== History ==
The constituency was created by the Redistribution of Seats Act 1885 for the 1885 general election, and abolished for the 1918 general election.

== Boundaries ==
1885–1918: The Strand District (comprising the Liberty of the Rolls, Precinct of the Savoy, St Anne, Soho, St Clement Danes, St Mary le Strand, and St Paul Covent Garden) and the parishes of St James, Westminster, and St Martin in the Fields.

== Members of Parliament ==
Election	Member	Party
1885	William Henry Smith	Conservative
1891	Frederick Smith	Conservative
1910	Walter Long	Conservative
1918	constituency abolished	

== Election results ==
Decades:	1880s; 1890s; 1900s; 1910s

=== Elections in the 1880s ===
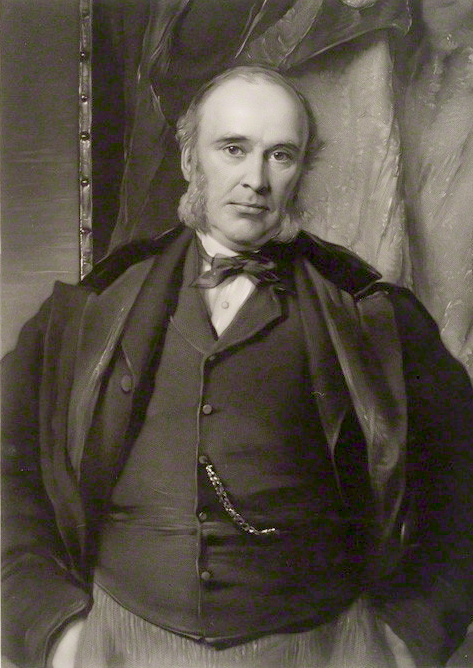
Smith

General election 1885: Strand
Party	Candidate	Votes	%	±%
Conservative	William Henry Smith	5,645	69.4	
Liberal	Edmund George Johnson	2,486	30.6	
Majority		3,159	38.8	
Turnout		8,131	72.2	
Registered electors		11,264		
Conservative win (new seat)				

General election 1886: Strand
Party	Candidate	Votes	%	±%
Conservative	William Henry Smith	5,034	76.9	+7.5
Liberal	John Edwin Hilary Skinner	1,508	23.1	−7.5
Majority		3,526	53.8	+15.0
Turnout		6,542	58.1	−14.1
Registered electors		11,264		
Conservative hold		Swing	+7.5	

Smith was appointed Secretary of State for War, requiring a by-election.

By-election, 11 Aug 1886: Strand
Party	Candidate	Votes	%	±%
Conservative	William Henry Smith	Unopposed		
Conservative hold				

=== Elections in the 1890s ===
Smith was appointed Lord Warden of the Cinque Ports, requiring a by-election.

By-election, 12 May 1891: Strand
Party	Candidate	Votes	%	±%
Conservative	William Henry Smith	Unopposed		
Conservative hold				

Smith's death caused a by-election.

By-election, 27 Oct 1891: Strand
Party	Candidate	Votes	%	±%
Conservative	Frederick Smith	4,952	71.8	−5.1
Liberal	Richard Sandon Gutteridge	1,946	28.2	+5.1
Majority		3,006	43.6	−10.2
Turnout		6,898	62.3	+4.2
Registered electors		11,081		
Conservative hold		Swing	−5.1	

General election 1892: Strand
Party	Candidate	Votes	%	±%
Conservative	Frederick Smith	Unopposed		
Conservative hold				

General election 1895: Strand
Party	Candidate	Votes	%	±%
Conservative	Frederick Smith	Unopposed		
Conservative hold				

=== Elections in the 1900s ===
General election 1900: Strand
Party	Candidate	Votes	%	±%
Conservative	Frederick Smith	Unopposed		
Conservative hold				

General election 1906: Strand
Party	Candidate	Votes	%	±%
Conservative	Frederick Smith	3,935	68.0	N/A
Liberal	Alexander Waldemar Lawrence	1,854	32.0	New
Majority		2,081	36.0	N/A
Turnout		5,789	71.4	N/A
Registered electors		8,109		
Conservative hold				

=== Elections in the 1910s ===
Costello

General election January 1910: Strand
Party	Candidate	Votes	%	±%
Conservative	Walter Long	4,840	74.8	+6.8
Liberal	Leonard Costello	1,627	25.2	−6.8
Majority		3,213	49.6	+13.6
Turnout		6,467	80.6	+9.2
Registered electors		8,019		
Conservative hold		Swing	+6.8	

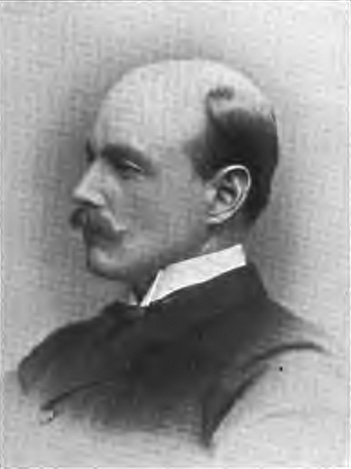
Long

General election December 1910: Strand
Party	Candidate	Votes	%	±%
Conservative	Walter Long	4,143	78.5	+3.7
Liberal	Samuel Robert Earle	1,138	21.5	−3.7
Majority		3,005	57.0	+7.4
Turnout		5,281	65.9	−14.7
Registered electors		8,019		
Conservative hold		Swing	+3.7	

General Election 1914–15:

Another General Election was required to take place before the end of 1915. The political parties had been making preparations for an election to take place and by July 1914, the following candidates had been selected;

- Unionist: Walter Long
- Liberal:
