= Strand District (Metropolis) =

Former local government district in England

Strand
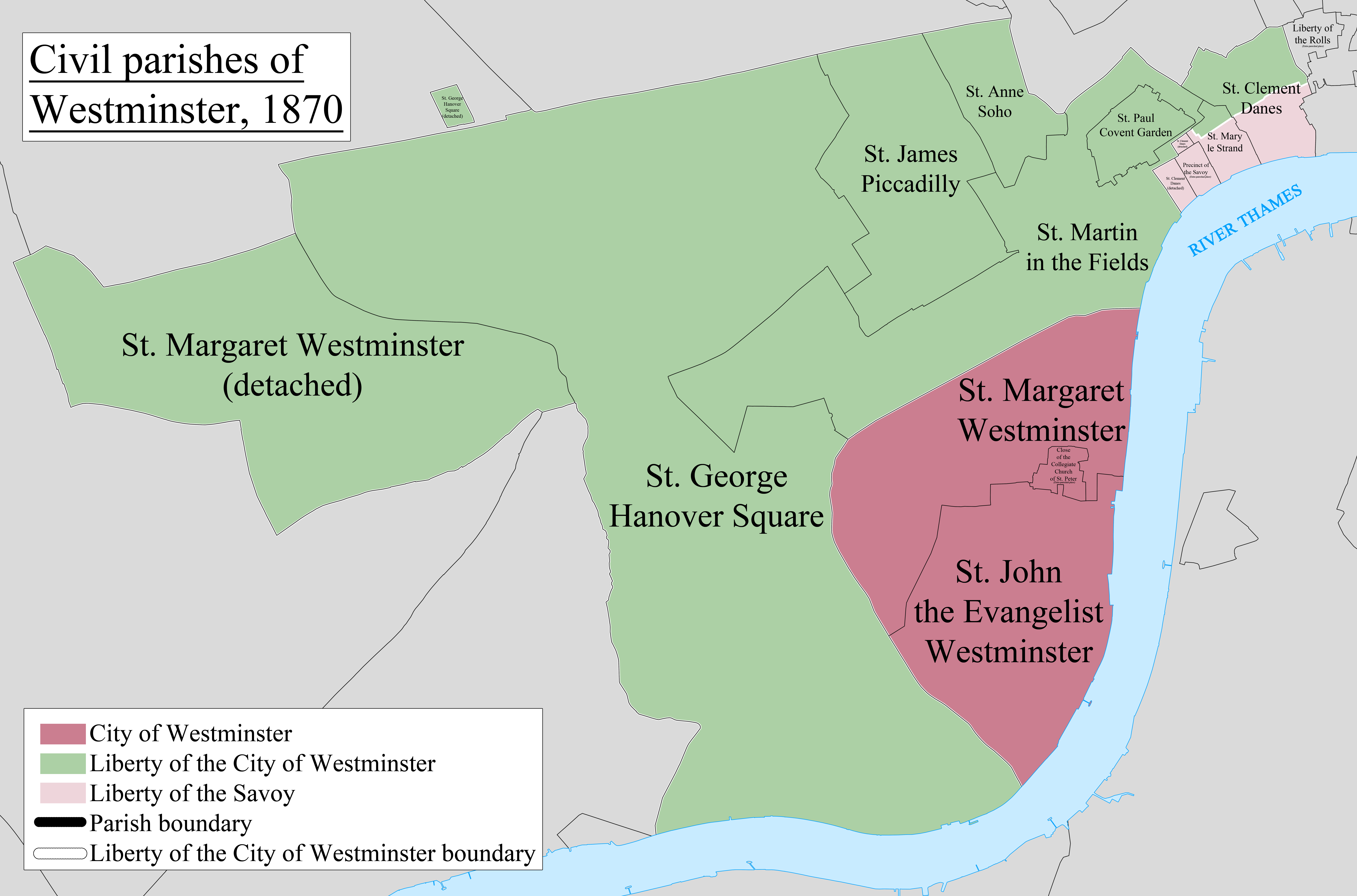
- History
  - Created: 1855
  - Abolished: 1900
  - Succeeded by: Metropolitan Borough of Westminster
- Status: District
- Government: Strand District Board of Works
  - HQ: Tavistock Street

Strand was a local government district within the metropolitan area of London, England, from 1855 to 1900.

Until 1889, the district was in the county of Middlesex, but included in the area of the Metropolitan Board of Works (MBW). In 1889, the area of the MBW was constituted as the County of London, and the district board became a local authority under the London County Council.

== Area ==
It was a similar area to the Strand Poor Law Union, which included St Anne, Soho and St Martin-in-the-Fields for only part of its existence. In 1885 the Strand Parliament constituency was formed covering a similar area, also including St Martin in the Fields. The district comprised the following civil parishes and places:

Parish or place	Status	Board members	Population 1851	Population 1901	Poor law
Liberty of the Rolls	Civil parish from 1866	3	2,567	252	Strand Union
Precinct of the Savoy	Civil parish from 1866	1	372	252	Strand Union
St Anne	Civil parish	18	17,335	11,493	Strand Union until 1868 then Westminster Union
St Clement Danes	Civil parish	15	15,662	6,090	Strand Union
St Mary le Strand	Civil parish	3	2,517	494	Strand Union
St Paul Covent Garden	Civil parish	9	5,810	1,692	Strand Union
Strand District	District	49	44,263	20,273	—

The main part of the district was bounded on the east by the City of London, on the north by the Holborn District and the St Giles District, and on the west by the parish of St Martin in the Fields. The parish of St Anne formed an exclave to the west.

== District board ==
The district was governed by the Strand District Board of Works, which consisted of forty-nine elected vestrymen: eighteen elected for the parish of St Anne Soho; fifteen for St Clement Danes; nine for St Paul Covent Garden; three each for St Mary le Strand and the Liberty of the Rolls and one for the Precinct of the Savoy. The first elections were held in November 1855, when the entire membership of the board was elected. Thereafter elections for one third of the seats were held in May, beginning in the year 1857.

Strand District was originally within the area of responsibility of the Metropolitan Board of Works and nominated one member to the MBW. In 1889 the area of the Metropolitan Board became the County of London, and Strand District Board of Works became a local council under the London County Council.

The district board established its headquarters at 22 Tavistock Street, Covent Garden, in 1857, on a site leased from the Duke of Bedford.

== Abolition ==
In 1899, the London Government Bill was introduced to Parliament. The bill sought to abolish the vestries and district boards in London and replace them with twenty-eight metropolitan boroughs. One of the boroughs included in the schedule to the bill grouped together Strand District with the areas of three other boards and vestries in the Westminster area as a new borough. This was vigorously resisted by the Strand District Board of Works along with the vestries of St Martin in the Fields and St James Westminster. Instead of what they dubbed "Greater Westminster", the three authorities instead proposed a Metropolitan Borough of The Strand, separate from Westminster, and with the same boundaries as the parliamentary borough of that name. The campaign met with no success, and on 1 November 1900 the Strand District became part of the Metropolitan Borough of Westminster.
