= Strand district =

Strand district could refer to:

- Strand, London, a road and area in London, England
- Strand District (Metropolis), a historic local government district in London, England
- Strand (UK Parliament constituency), historic constituency in London, England
- Strand Historic District, United States
