= Vestries Act 1831 =

Act of the Parliament of the United Kingdom

Vestries Act 1831 (Note: The citation of this act by this short title was authorised by section 1 of, and the first schedule to, the Short Titles Act 1896. Due to the repeal of those provisions it is now authorised by section 19(2) of the Interpretation Act 1978.)
- Act of Parliament
- Parliament of the United Kingdom
- Long title: An Act for the better Regulation of Vestries, and for the Appointment of Auditors of Accounts, in certain Parishes of England and Wales.
- Citation: 1 & 2 Will. 4. c. 60
- Territorial extent: United Kingdom

Dates
- Royal assent: 20 October 1831
- Commencement: 20 October 1831 (Note: The Acts of Parliament (Commencement) Act 1793.)
- Repealed: 1 June 1992
Other legislation
Amended by	Local Government Act 1894; Charities Act 1960
Repealed by	Church of England (Miscellaneous Provisions) Measure 1992

Status: Repealed

Text of statute as originally enacted

Revised text of statute as amended

The Vestries Act 1831 (1 & 2 Will. 4. c. 60), commonly known as Hobhouse's Vestry Act (named after the Whig frontbencher Sir John Hobhouse, later created Lord Broughton), was an act of the Parliament of the United Kingdom. The act overhauled local government, which also affected the Established Church at a local level. The act gave subsidiarity in that local ratepayers would have to agree by a special majority for the reform to take effect in their local area (parish).

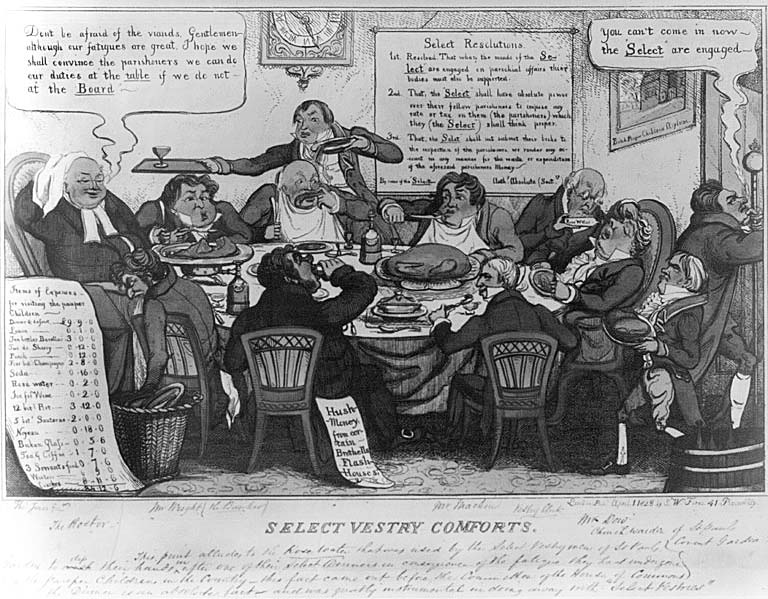
Satirical cartoon of the select vestry of St. Paul's, Covent Garden. Thomas Jones 1828

Where locally approved it replaced the select vestry (the local government where not an open vestry and which was in most cases a narrow oligarchy) with a non-co-opted system of vestrymen (vestry members) to be instead elected by ratepayers (male and female) who had been resident in the parish for more than a year.

To adopt the act (reform) the parish had to have over 800 ratepayers (thus excluding almost all rural parishes), of whom at least two-thirds would need to vote in support of the reform.

The five metropolitan parishes to adopt the act were:

- St George Hanover Square
- St Marylebone
- St Pancras
- Westminster St James
- Westminster St John

Membership of their vestries were replaced over a period of three years with a series of elections.

The Metropolis Management Act 1855 (18 & 19 Vict. c. 120) went further by abolishing the remaining select vestries of all metropolitan parishes in 1855 and extended the principle of election by ratepayers.
