= Metropolitan Borough of Westminster =

Historic borough of London, England

Coordinates: 51.499°N 0.138°W

Westminster
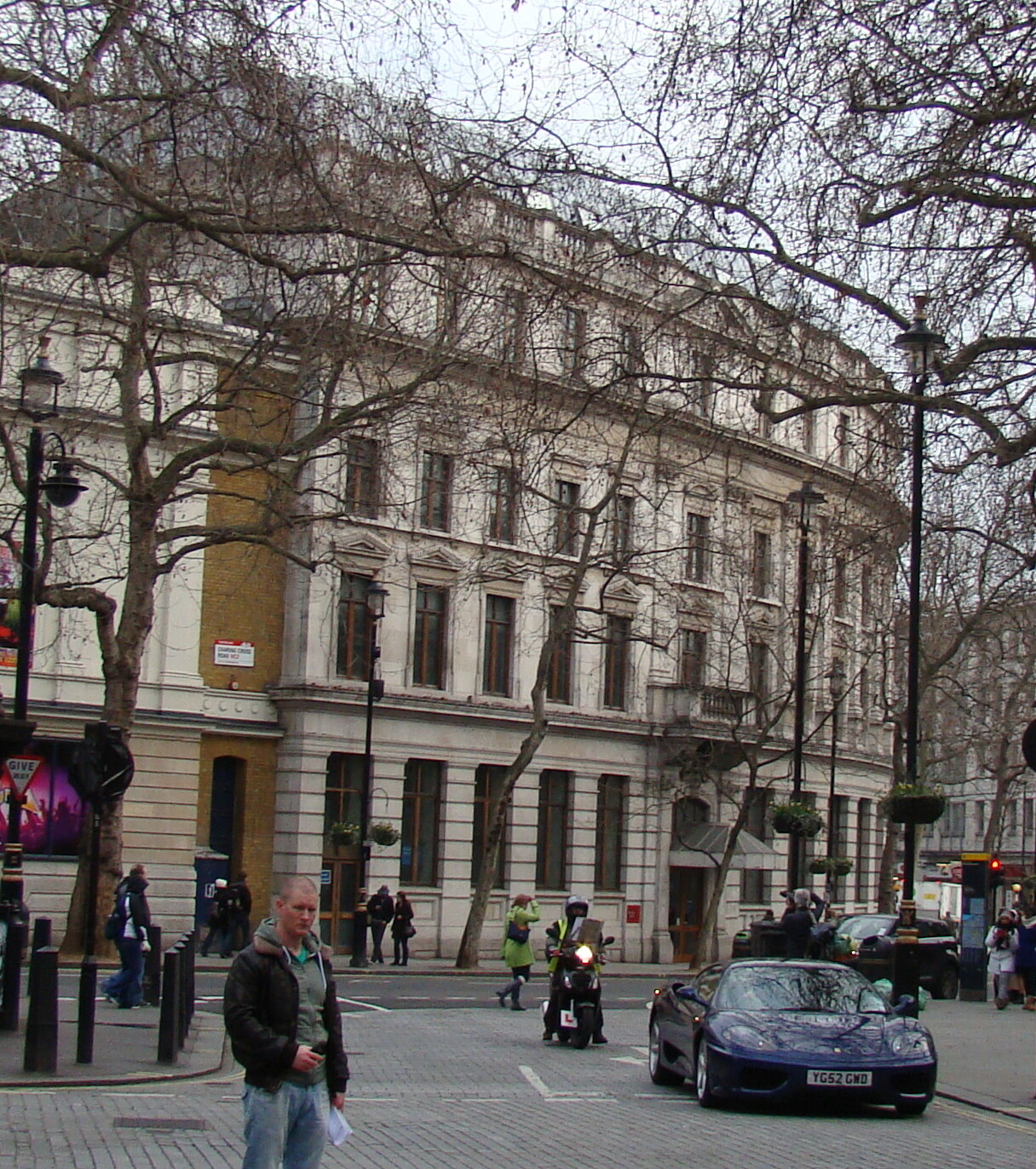
- The Old City Hall

- Westminster within the County of London
- Area
  - 1911: 2,503 acres (10.13 km^{2})
  - 1961: 2,505 acres (10.14 km^{2})
- Population
  - 1911: 160,261
  - 1961: 85,735
- Density
  - 1911: 64/acre
  - 1961: 34/acre
- History
  - Origin: Liberty of Westminster
  - Created: 1900
  - Abolished: 1965
  - Succeeded by: City of Westminster (London borough)
- Status: Metropolitan borough City (1900–1965); Civil parish (1922–1965)
- Government: Westminster City Council
  - HQ: Westminster City Hall, Charing Cross Road WC2
  - Motto: Custodi Civitatem Domine (O Lord, watch over the City)
- Coat of arms of Westminster City Council
- Map of boundary

The Metropolitan Borough of Westminster was a metropolitan borough in the County of London, England, from 1900 to 1965.

== City status ==
By royal charter dated 29 October 1900, the borough was granted the title City of Westminster. Westminster had originally been created a city and seat of the short-lived Diocese of Westminster in 1541. The diocese was suppressed in 1550, but the area was still known as a "city", although without official sanction.

== Arms and motto ==
The arms of Westminster represent two monarchs, closely associated with the city. Edward the Confessor, who rebuilt the church of St Peter (Westminster Abbey), and Henry VII, who added a chapel within the Abbey. The portcullis and rose emblems are derived from the Tudor dynasty, from which Westminster first achieved its status; and they appear throughout many public and religious buildings in Westminster, and the portcullis was adopted by the House of Commons. The supporting lions are adopted from the Cecil family, who have had a long association with the borough. The arms were first granted in 1601.

The motto Custodi Civitatem Domine, is translated as O Lord, watch over the City.

The arms can still be seen on the Portland stone parapet of the Old City Hall in Charing Cross Road (built in 1890–91 by Robert Walker, replacing an earlier vestry hall). It can also be seen on the entrance to the car park beneath 10 Spring Gardens (home of the British Council) and on Chelsea and Hammersmith Bridges.

== Formation and boundaries ==
It consisted of the area that is now part of the City of Westminster and south of Oxford Street and Bayswater Road. It included Soho, Mayfair, St. James's, The Strand, Westminster, Pimlico, Belgravia, and Hyde Park.

The borough was formed from eleven civil parishes and extra-parochial places: Close of the Collegiate Church of St Peter, Liberty of the Rolls, Precinct of the Savoy, St Anne Soho, St Clement Danes, St George Hanover Square, St James Piccadilly, St Martin in the Fields, St Mary-le-Strand, St Paul Covent Garden and Westminster St Margaret and St John. These eleven were combined into a single civil parish called City of Westminster, which was conterminous with the metropolitan borough, in 1922.

Previous to the borough's formation it had been administered by five separate local bodies: the Vestry of St George Hanover Square, the Vestry of St Martin in the Fields, Strand District Board of Works, Westminster District Board of Works and the Vestry of Westminster St James. The Close of the Collegiate Church of St Peter had not been under the control of any local authority prior to 1900.

== Population and area ==
The borough covered 2,503 acres (10.1 km^{2}). The population recorded in the Census was:

Constituent parishes 1801–1899

Year	1801	1811	1821	1831	1841	1851	1861	1871	1881	1891
Population	160,759	168,657	189,543	209,229	229,473	244,531	257,232	248,714	229,784	198,871

Metropolitan Borough 1900–1961

Year	1901	1911	1921	1931	1941	1951	1961
Population	183,011	160,261	141,578	129,579		99,048	85,735

== Politics ==
A map showing the wards of Westminster Metropolitan Borough as they appeared in 1916.

The borough was divided into fourteen wards for elections: Charing Cross, Conduit, Covent Garden, Great Marlborough, Grosvenor, Hamlet of Knightsbridge, Knightsbridge St George's, Pall Mall, Regent, St Anne, St John, St Margaret, Strand and Victoria.

=== Parliament constituency ===
For elections to Parliament, the borough was divided into three constituencies:

- St George's, Hanover Square
- Strand
- Westminster

In 1918 the borough's representation was reduced to two seats:

- Westminster Abbey
- Westminster St George's

In 1950 the borough's representation was reduced to half a seat, when it was merged with the City of London:

- Cities of London and Westminster

== Poor law ==
The parishes which made up the borough were within the St George's, Strand and Westminster unions. The unions were amalgamated in 1913 to form the City of Westminster Union. The parishes and unions were then abolished in 1922 and replaced with a single City of Westminster parish for poor law purposes. The parish continued to exist until 1965, but ceased to have any role in the administration of the poor law in 1930 when responsibility transferred to the London County Council.

== Replacement ==
It was abolished in 1965 and its area became part of the City of Westminster, a London borough, along with the Metropolitan Borough of Paddington and the Metropolitan Borough of St Marylebone.
