= St Clement Danes (parish) =

- Civil parish
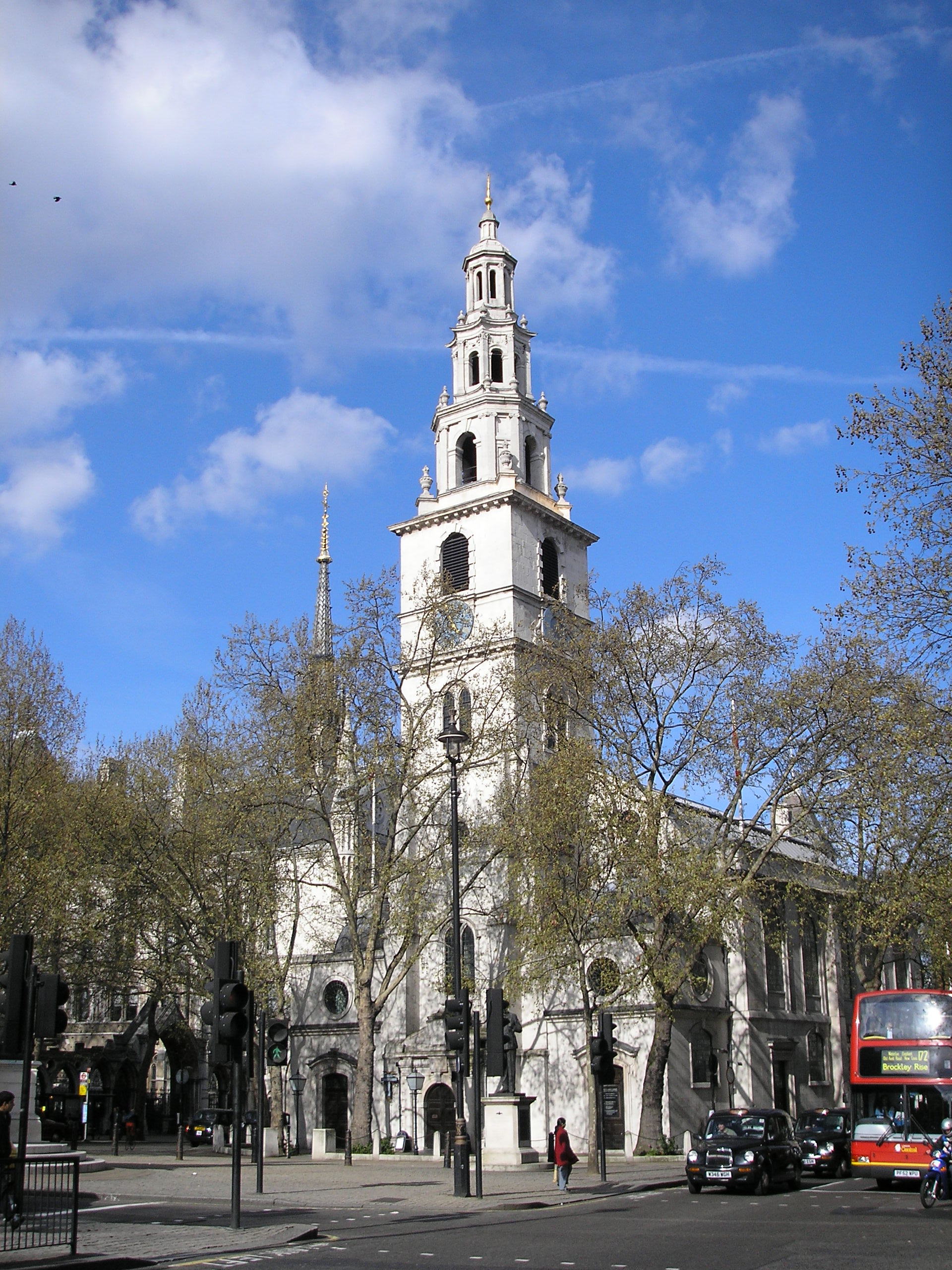

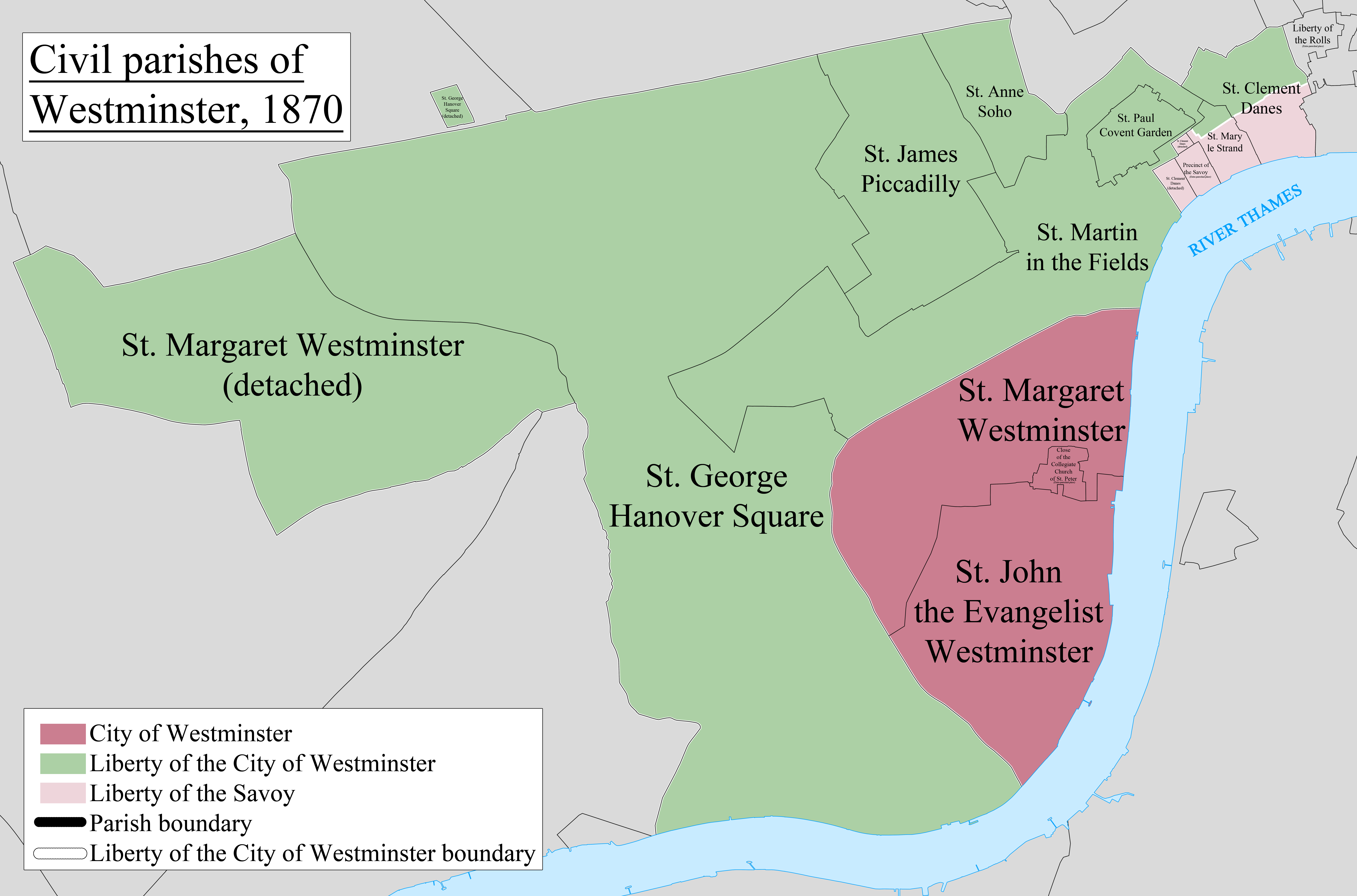
- Area
  - 1881: 53 acres (0.21 km^{2})
  - 1901/1921: 57 acres (0.23 km^{2})
  - Coordinates: 51.5138°N 0.1158°W
- Population
  - 1881: 10,280
  - 1901: 6,090
  - 1921: 1,905
- Density
  - 1881: 194/acre
  - 1901: 107/acre
  - 1921: 33/acre
- History
  - Origin: Ancient parish
  - Created: before 1190
  - Abolished: 1922
  - Succeeded by: City of Westminster
- Status: Civil parish
- Government: St Clement Danes Vestry (16th century–1855)
  - Type: Vestry
  - HQ: Vestry Hall, Strand
- Contained within
  - District: Strand (1855–1900)
  - Poor Law Union: Strand (1836–1913); City of Westminster (1913–1922)

St Clement Danes was a civil parish in the metropolitan area of London, England; an ecclesiastical version remains (see its Anglican church, St Clement Danes). The parish was split between the Liberty of Westminster and the Liberty of the Duchy of Lancaster (also known as of the Savoy). The area is colloquially split between Aldwych and Adelphi areas associated with the larger Strand area in the extreme east of the City of Westminster. It includes hotels, restaurants, the Indian and Australian High Commissions and the London School of Economics. To its west is Charing Cross station which faces Trafalgar Square. At the 1921 census (the last before the abolition of the parish), St Clement Danes had a population of 1905.

== Toponymy ==
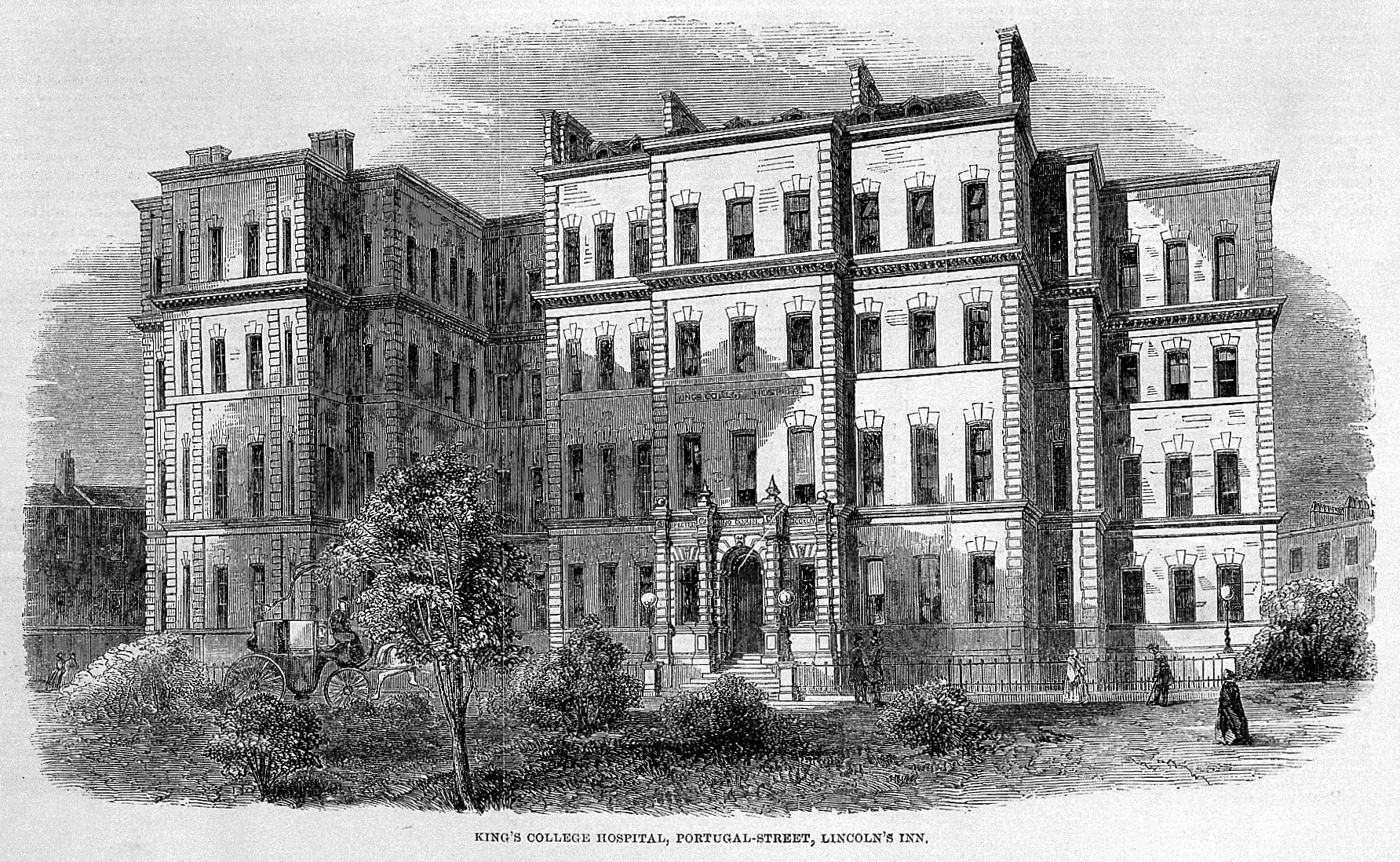
King's College Hospital in Portugal Street, Lincoln Inn Fields c1840s

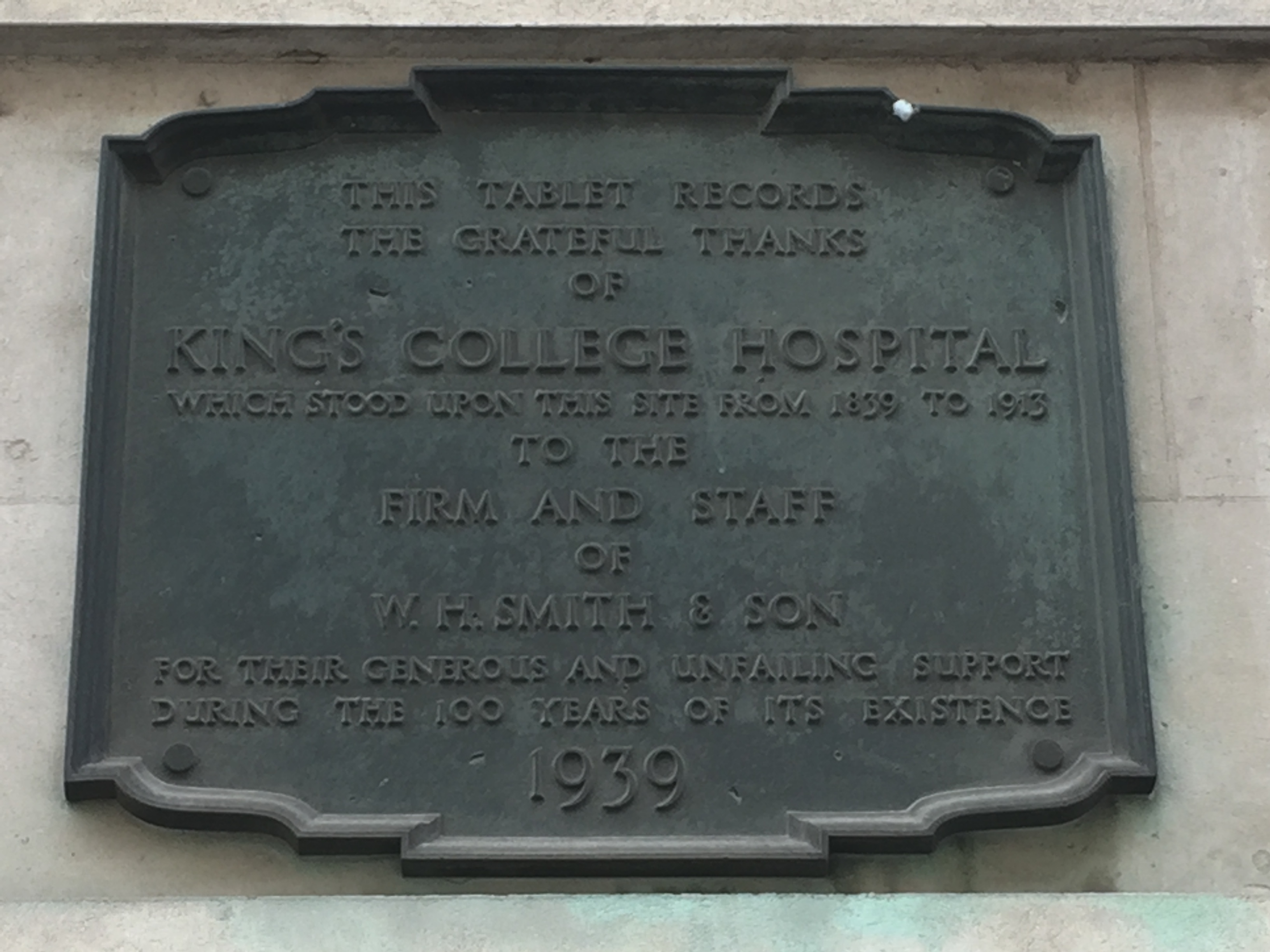
Plaque marking where King's College Hospital once stood, now on LSE grounds

It took its name from the dedication of the church of St Clement Danes. It is recorded in the early 12th century as parochia Sancti Clementis ecclesie Dacorum or 'the parish of St Clement's church of the Danes'. The name suggests there were Danes living in the area, to the west of the City of London.

== Governance ==
It was first recorded in 1190, being as such a relatively ancient parish; about half was in the Liberty of Westminster and half in the Ossulstone hundred of Middlesex until its final forms when other parishes had been created absorbing parts of its earlier area. The medieval parish lay partly in the vill of Westminster, being one of four parishes of Westminster, and partly in the soke of Leicester a city in the English Midlands. The Ossulstone section formed part of the Liberty of the Duchy of Lancaster. The parish was included in the returns of the Bills of mortality from 1604.

In 1826 the stocks belonging to the parish, situated in Portugal Street were removed and destroyed. They were thought to be the last remaining in London.

The parish was grouped into the Strand District in 1855 when it came within the area of responsibility of the Metropolitan Board of Works. In 1889 the parish became part of the County of London and in 1900 it became part of the Metropolitan Borough of Westminster. On 1 April 1922 the parish was abolished to form City of Westminster.

== Hospital ==
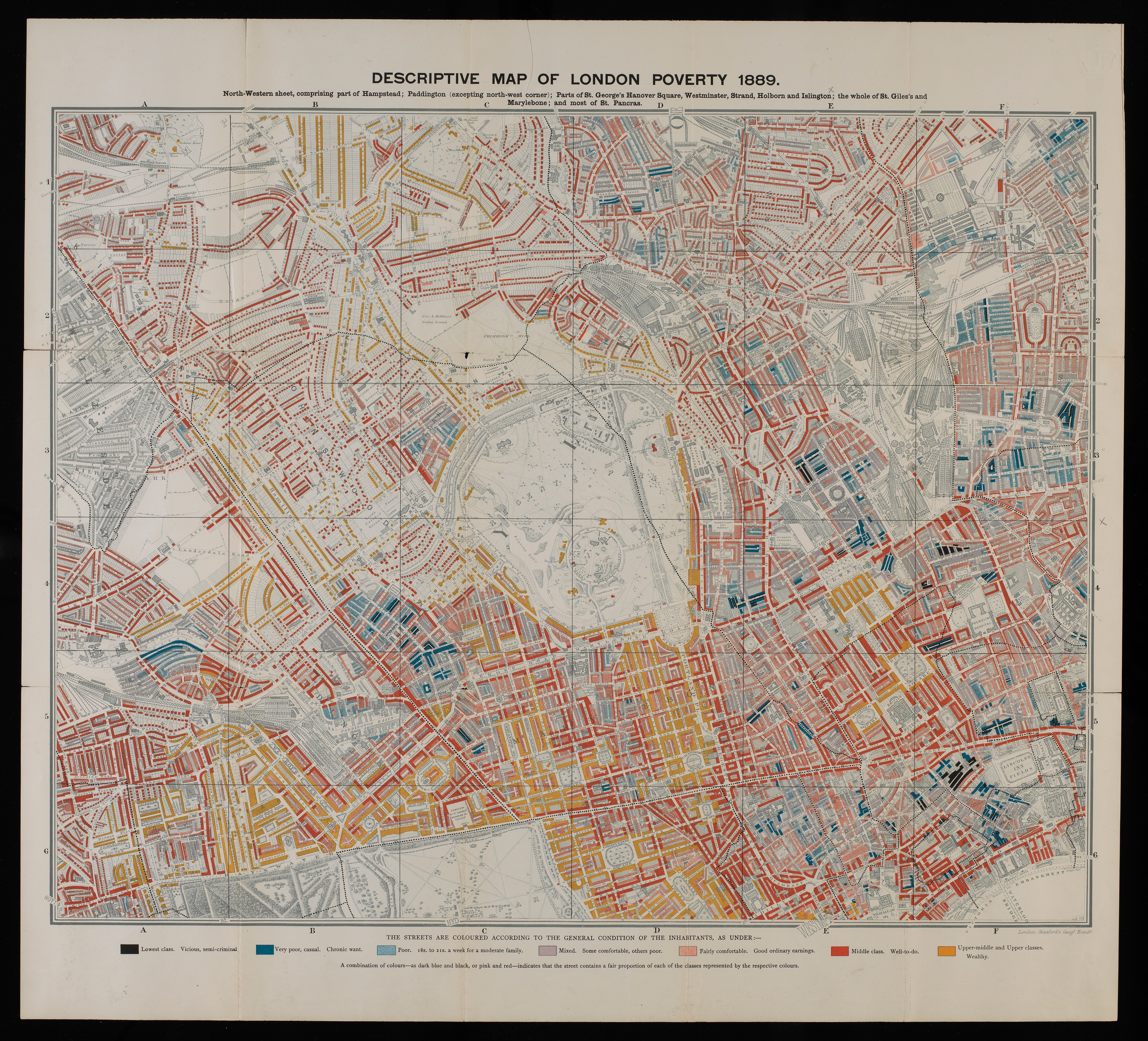
The lower right box of Booth's poverty map, 1889 shows the dotted lines of the parish containing a greater than average proportion of blue, poor streets relative to other areas of the broad West End of London

King's College Hospital was originally opened in 1840 in the disused St Clement Danes parish workhouse in Portugal Street, as a training facility where medical students of King's College London could practice and receive instruction from the college's own professors. Booth's poverty map shows a generation later remnant streets of the intense poverty which formed much of the parish of the 1840s — overcrowded tenements characterised by poverty and disease and the hospital was treating annually 1,290 inpatients in 120 beds, with two patients sharing a bed by no means unusual. The hospital later moved to its present site in Denmark Hill.

== Geography ==
The parish consisted of two areas extending into the left (north) half of the Thames.

The main part formed the east part of Westminster vill which was largely gardens and rural until the late medieval period. It adjoined the Liberty of the Rolls and the Temple area of the City of London. To the west it had a straight boundary with two parishes of contrasting size: St Martin in the Fields (large) and St Mary le Strand (very small). To the north it was bounded by St Giles in the Fields.

The western detached part was very small; it lay between an arm of St Martin in the Fields by the river and the few-acres Precinct of the Savoy of similar size to St Mary le Strand also by the river.

Demography

| Year | Population | Initial acreage and changes |
|---|---|---|
| 1801 | 13,001 | not known |
| 1811 | 13,706 | not known |
| 1821 | 14,763 | not known |
| 1831 | 15,442 | 52 acres (0.21 km^{2}) |
| 1841 | 15,602 | unchanged |
| 1851 | 15,662 | ▼9 |
| 1881 | 10,280 | ▲10 |
| 1891 | 8,492 | ▲2 |
| 1901 | 6,090 | ▲2 |
| 1911 | 3,152 | unchanged |
| 1921 | 1,905 | unchanged |

Ecclesiastical successor

The boundaries are the same in the Church of England as the final form of the civil parish save that St Mary le Strand is combined; it has a third place of worship, King's College Chapel, London. The two churches are known as the "island churches" forming traffic islands.
