= City and Liberty of Westminster =

Unit of local government in Middlesex, England

Coordinates: 51.499°N 0.128°W

Westminster City of Westminster and Its Liberty
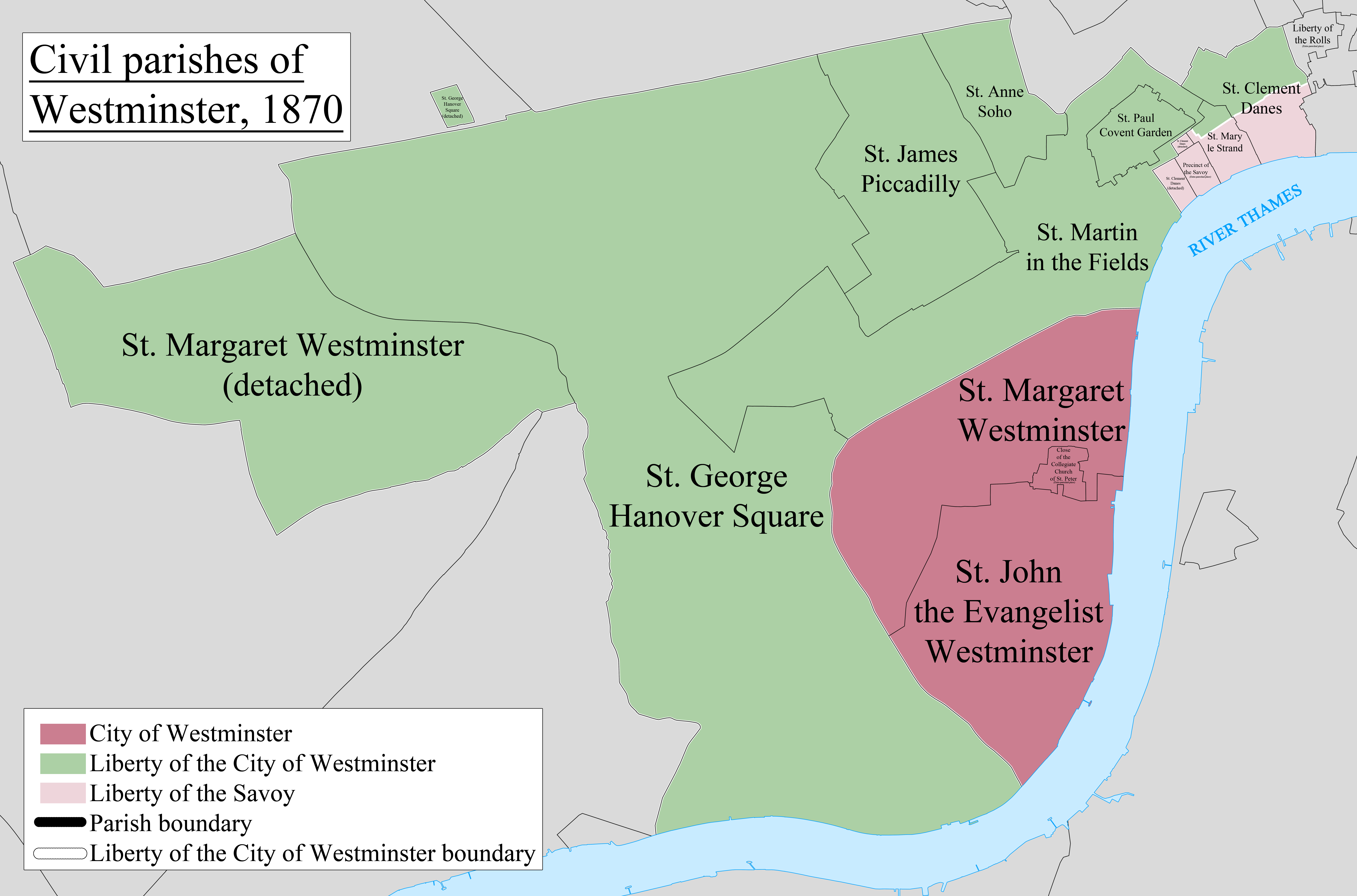
- Area
  - 1831: 2,500 acres (10 km^{2})
- Population
  - 1831: 202,850
- Density
  - 1831: 81/acre
- History
  - Abolished: 1900
  - Succeeded by: Metropolitan Borough of Westminster
- Government: Westminster Court of Burgesses
  - HQ: Westminster
- Coat of arms of Westminster from 1601
- Subdivisions
  - Type: Wards
  - Units: 12

The City and Liberty of Westminster was a unit of local government in the county of Middlesex, England. It was located immediately to the west of the City of London. Originally under the control of Westminster Abbey, the local authority for the area was the Westminster Court of Burgesses from 1585 to 1900. The area now forms the southern part of the City of Westminster in Greater London.

== Governance ==
Following the dissolution of Westminster Abbey, a court of burgesses (the Westminster Court of Burgesses) was formed in 1585 to govern the Westminster area, previously under the abbey's control. The City and Liberties of Westminster were further defined by letters patent in 1604, and the court of burgesses and liberty continued in existence until 1900, and the creation of the Metropolitan Borough of Westminster.

The court of burgesses (or court leet) was headed by the High Steward of Westminster Abbey, who was usually a prominent national politician. He appointed a high bailiff, who served for life, and performed most of the functions usually exercised by a high sheriff of a county. The city and liberty were divided into twelve wards, each with a burgess and assistant burgess, this arrangement being adopted from the system then used in the City of London. Eight wards were located in the parish of St Margaret, three in St Martin in the Fields, and one for St Clement Danes and the Strand area.

The burgesses chose two head burgesses, one for the city and one for the liberty, who ranked next after the high bailiff. A high constable was appointed by the court leet, under whom was a force of constables. These were absorbed by the Metropolitan Police in 1829.

Following the dissolution of the court of burgesses in 1900, a link has been retained to the old corporation, as the Lord Mayor of Westminster is ex officio Deputy High Steward of Westminster Abbey.

Westminster returned two members to Parliament. Although outside the Liberty of Westminster, eligible inhabitants of the Liberty of the Savoy, which included part of the parishes of St Clement Danes and St Mary le Strand voted with Westminster.

The City and Liberty of Westminster was a franchise coroner's district until 1930, when it became part of the Central district of the County of London.

=== Constituent parishes and other areas ===
The City of Westminster consisted of:

- The main part of the parish of St Margaret; after 1727 the combined parishes of St Margaret and St John.
- The extra-parochial Close of the Collegiate Church of St Peter around Westminster Abbey

The Liberty of the City of Westminster consisted of:

- The detached part of the parish of St Margaret
- The parish of St Martin in the Fields; later partly divided into St Anne (1687), St George Hanover Square (1724), St Paul Covent Garden (1645) and St James (1685)
- Part of the parish of St Clement Danes (Note: Remainder in the Liberty of the Savoy)
- Part of the parish of St Mary-le-Strand
- The extra-parochial St James's Palace
- Privy Gardens (also known as Whitehall Gardens)
- Verge of the Palaces of St James and Whitehall (also known as Whitehall)

== Geography ==
The Penny Cyclopaedia in 1843 describes the boundaries as:

formed on the southern and chief part of the eastern side by the left bank of the river Thames. The boundary leaves the river about midway between Waterloo bridge and Hungerford market, and with a little deviation follows the course of the Strand eastward to Temple Bar, being separated from the river in this part by what is termed the liberty of the duchy of Lancaster and by the western part of the Temple. The boundary turns northward from Temple Bar up Shire Lane, and then runs in an irregular line westward, keeping to the south of Lincoln’s Inn Fields till it reaches Drury Lane: it then turns north-westward up Drury Lane to Castle Street, and again turn westward and then northward runs by Castle Street, West Street, and Crown Street, Soho, to the eastern end of Oxford Street. The northern boundary runs in a very direct line westward along Oxford Street and the north side of Hyde Park and Kensington Gardens, making a small detour in one place, so as to include St. George’s burying-ground, to the northern end of the Serpentine river. From this point the western boundary follows the course of the Serpentine and of a stream which runs from its south-eastern extremity, now for the most part covered over, west of Kinnerton Street (which runs at the back of Wilton Crescent), Lowndes Street, Chesham Street, Westbourn Street, and the Commercial Road, to the Thames just in front of Chelsea Hospital.
