= Liberty of the Savoy =

Area within London

Coordinates: 51.5097°N 0.1200°W

The Savoy Liberty of the Duchy of Lancaster
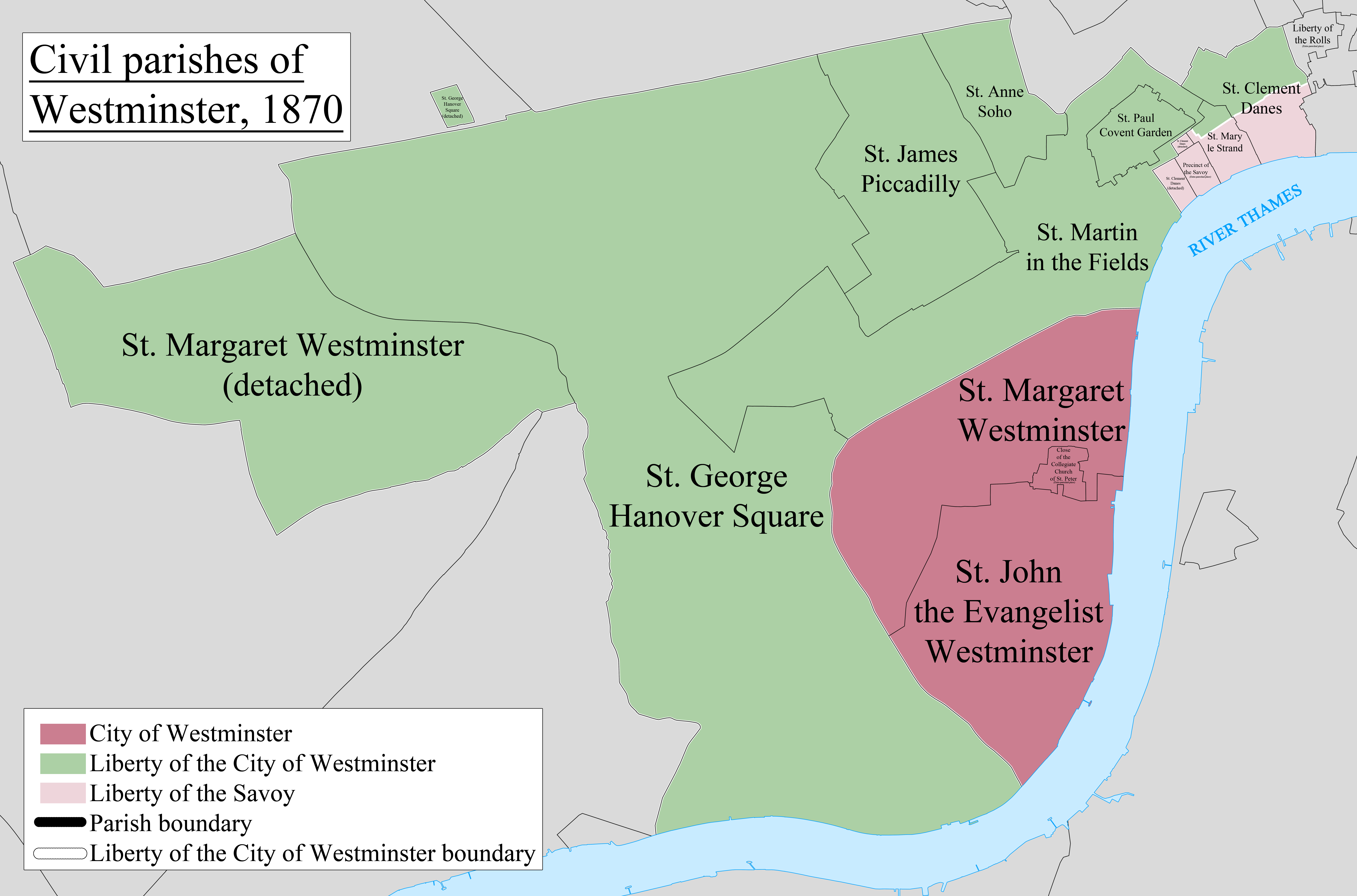
- History
  - Created: 1246
- Status: Manor, Liberty
- Government: Court Leet of the Savoy
  - HQ: Somerset House
- Subdivisions
  - Type: Wards (4)
  - Units: Church, Middle, Royal, Savoy

The Savoy was a manor and liberty located between the Liberty of Westminster, on two sides, the Inner and Middle Temple part of the City of London and the River Thames. It was in the county of Middlesex. Named for the Savoy Palace, it came to be held by the Duchy of Lancaster, and was also known as the Liberty of the Duchy of Lancaster. The duchy continues to have land holdings within the area. The manor, enjoying the status of a liberty, comprised the precinct of the Savoy, the southern half and detached south-west of the parish of St Clement Danes and about three quarters of St Mary le Strand as it only, in a tiny part, extended north of Strand whereas those parishes straddled this ancient road.

== History ==
=== Toponymy ===
Savoy is derived from Peter II, Count of Savoy who was granted land by Henry III in 1246.

=== Palace and hospital ===
The land for the palace was granted by Henry III to Peter of Savoy, uncle of his queen, Eleanor of Provence, and was renamed Savoy Palace. Peter in turn gave the palace to the Congregation of Canons of the Great Saint Bernard, and it became the "Great Hospital of St Bernard de Monte Jovis in Savoy". The hospital was purchased by Queen Eleanor who gave the site to her second son, Edmund, Earl of Lancaster. When Edward I became king, he confirmed the ownership of the Savoy area to Edmund with letters patent.

=== Duchy liberty ===
In 1351 Henry of Grosmont, a great-grandson of Henry III, was created the 1st Duke of Lancaster for services in the Hundred Years' War. The seat of Lancaster in Lancashire was raised to a county palatine. (Note: Palatine (which has primary syllable stress) is the relevant adjective; Palatinate (which has stress on the second syllable) is the noun, used alone.) This meant the area was ruled by hereditary noblemen possessing special authority and autonomy from the rest of the Kingdom of England. Although the noblemen swore allegiance to the king, they had the power to rule the county and its contiguous land largely independently of the king. All other properties attached to the Duchy of Lancaster, including the Savoy became subject to the laws of the duke. As a consequence, someone being pursued for a debt in London could reside in the Savoy without fear of arrest by people acting under the authority of The Crown. Royal writs were not enforceable within the County of Lancashire until the 19th century. Lancaster had its own Court of Chancery until the 1970s. These circumstances have been used in historical fiction, such as the Aubrey-Maturin novels by Patrick O'Brian or John Pearce series by David Donachie.

== Governance ==
The area was a parcel of the Duchy of Lancaster. It was divided into four wards, Church, Middle, Royal and Savoy. It was governed by a court leet.

The liberty of the Savoy was part of Middlesex, and those connected with it eligible to vote at parliamentary elections were electors for the seats of Westminster.

The Liberty of the Savoy was a franchise coroner's district until 1930, when it became part of the Central district of the County of London.

The practice of beating the bounds was abandoned by the Duchy of Lancaster in 1969 and revived in 2010.

The Duchy of Lancaster continues to have land holdings within the area.

== Geography ==
The Savoy had the River Thames as its southern limit. About 95% of it was south of the Strand. It was made up of parts of two parishes and one extra-parochial place. These were from west to east:

- A rectangular part of the parish of St Clement Danes, south of the Strand, now the location of the Savoy Hotel and Shell Mex House.
- All of the Precinct of the Savoy, now the location of the Savoy Chapel, Savoy Street and the IET London.
- Part of the parish of St Clement Danes, north of the Strand, around Burleigh House/Lyceum Theatre.
- The southern 3/4 of the parish of St Mary le Strand, now mostly taken up by Somerset House.
- About half of the main part of the parish of St Clement Danes, south of the Strand.

The limits are shown by a series of markers.
