= Bills of mortality =

16th–19th century London death records

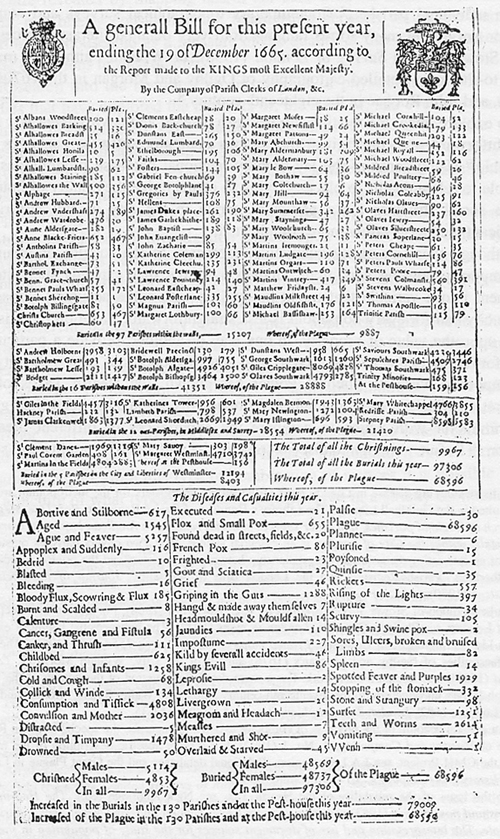
Annual return for 1665

Bills of mortality were the weekly mortality statistics in London, designed to monitor burials from 1527 and became weekly in 1592, and continuously from 1603. The responsibility to produce the statistics was chartered in 1611 to the Worshipful Company of Parish Clerks. The bills covered an area that started to expand as London grew from the City of London, before reaching its maximum extent in 1636. New parishes were then only added where ancient parishes within the area were divided. Factors such as the use of suburban cemeteries outside the area, the exemption of extra-parochial places within the area, the wider growth of the metropolis, and that they recorded burials rather than deaths, rendered their data incomplete. Production of the bills went into decline from 1819 as parishes ceased to provide returns, with the last surviving weekly bill dating from 1858. They were superseded by the weekly returns of the Registrar General from 1840, taking in further parishes until 1847. This area became the district of the Metropolitan Board of Works in 1855, the County of London in 1889 and Inner London in 1965.

== History ==
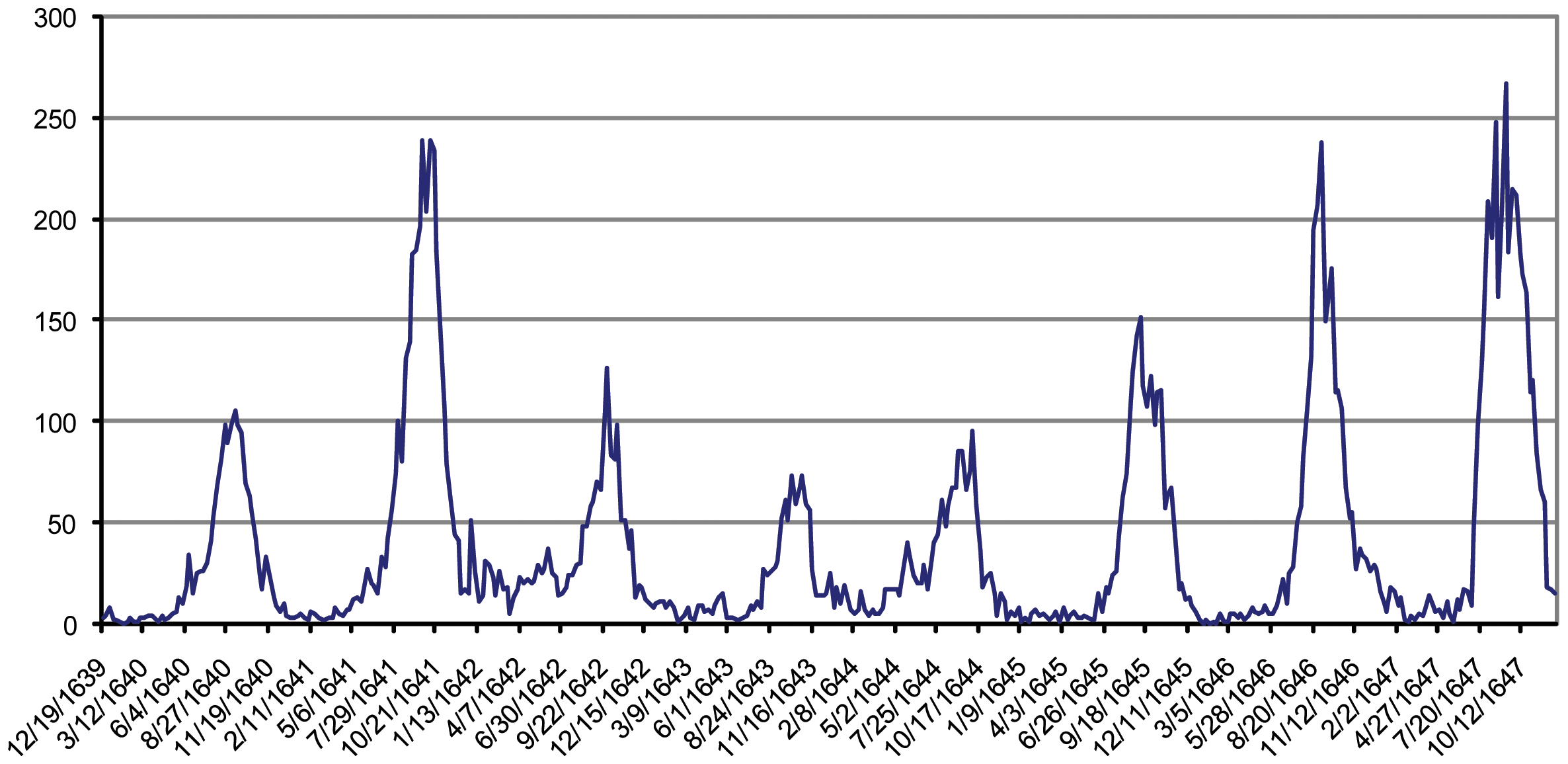
Deaths attributed to plague recorded in the weekly Bills of Mortality, 1639–1647. A significant annual peak during the warmer months of the year is evident.

The bills were produced intermittently in the several parishes of the City of London during outbreaks of plague. The first Bill is believed to date from November 1532. The first regular weekly collection and publishing of the number of burials in the parishes of London began on 21 December 1592 and continued until 18 December 1595. None of these original bills survive. The practice was abandoned and then revived on 21 December 1603 when there was another outbreak of plague. In 1611 the duty to produce the bills was imposed on the members of the Worshipful Company of Parish Clerks by a charter granted by James I. Annual returns were made on 21 December (the feast of St Thomas), to coincide with the city calendar. New charters were granted by Charles I in 1636 and 1639. The bills covered 129 parishes at the granting of the 1639 charter.

By 1570, the bills included baptisms; in 1629 the cause of death was given, and in December 1727 the age at death.

In 1632, the Clerks were asked to identify five different infectious diseases caused by human-to-human transmission: tuberculosis, smallpox, measles, French pox, and plague.

In 1819 the bills ceased to be published under the authority of the Corporation of London, coming directly from the Worshipful Company of Parish Clerks. The clerk of St George Hanover Square ceased to provide returns from 1823. From then until 1858 the practice of producing bills of mortality was in decline, as parishes ceased to provide returns to the Worshipful Company of Parish Clerks. The last surviving bill of mortality is believed to be from 28 September 1858.

== Problems with the bills ==
The area fixed in 1636, adding only St Mary le Strand in 1726 which was already within the outer boundary of the bills. The area quickly became much smaller than the growing metropolis. The bills recorded burials in Church of England churchyards and not deaths. The bills did not include the English Dissenters, Roman Catholics or those of other faiths. From 1830 burials started to take place outside the bills area in the large suburban cemeteries. Extra-parochial places and certain churches within the area failed to give returns because they were outside the normal parish system. For example, the Church of St Peter ad Vincula in the Tower of London was added in 1729, but was excluded in 1730 because of a successful claim of being extra-parochial. These defects meant that the bills failed to record approximately a third of deaths in the Metropolis.

When someone died within the prescribed limits of London a message was sent to a searcher by an undertaker or relative or friend with the name, age and cause of death of the deceased. The searcher would then proceed to the place of death for an inspection to authenticate the information. For this service they were entitled to ask a fee of one shilling from the family or friends of the deceased in the 19th century. The searchers were generally elderly women, some of whom were "notorious for their habits of drinking." Sometimes two searchers would attend and demand a shilling each. In some cases, they would also demand an item of clothing in which the deceased had died as a perquisite.

== Places within the bills ==
These places were within the boundaries of the bills of mortality:

County	Parts thereof
City of London	Entire, comprising: 97 parishes within the Walls; 16 parishes without the Walls; Inns of Court and Inns of Chancery
Middlesex	The City and Liberty of Westminster; The Tower and its Liberty (including the Old Artillery Ground); St Andrew Holborn above Bars with St George the Martyr; (Note: Formed 1767 by separating the Middlesex portion of the parish St Andrew Holborn from the remainder in the City of London and merging with the parish of St George the Martyr.) St Matthew, Bethnal Green; (Note: Formed from part of Stepney in 1743.) St Botolph without Aldgate; The Charterhouse; Christchurch, Spitalfields; (Note: Formed from part of Stepney in 1729.) St Clement Danes (part); (Note: The remainder of the parish lay in the Liberty of Westminster.) St James and St John, Clerkenwell; (Note: The parish of St John was formed from part of St James in 1723.) Liberty of the Duchy of Lancaster (part); Ely Place; St Giles in the Fields and St George, Bloomsbury; (Note: The two parishes of St Giles and St George were united in 1774.) St George in the East; Liberty of Glasshouse Yard; St John, Hackney; St Mary, Islington; St Katherine near the Tower; St Ann, Limehouse; (Note: Formed from Stepney in 1725.) St Luke, Middlesex; (Note: Parish created 1733 from the part of St Giles Cripplegate outside the City of London.) Liberty of the Rolls; Liberty of Saffron Hill and Hatton Garden; St John the Baptist in the Savoy; St Sepulchre (part); (Note: The remainder of the parish lay in the City of London.) St Paul, Shadwell; (Note: Formed from part of Stepney in 1670.) St Leonard, Shoreditch; St Dunstan, Stepney (the hamlets of Ratcliffe, Mile End Old Town and Mile End New Town); St John, Wapping; St Mary, Whitechapel (Note: Formed from part of Stepney in the early 17th century.)
Surrey	The Borough of Southwark (the parishes of St George the Martyr, St John Horsleydown, St Olave, St Saviour, St Thomas, and Christchurch (Note: Parish of Christchurch, Southwark formed 1670: originally the Liberty of Paris Garden.)) St Mary, Rotherhithe; St Mary, Bermondsey; St Mary, Newington Butts; St Mary, Lambeth

== Population ==
The population of the parishes in bills of mortality area, as it was fixed in 1726, consisting of some 21,587 acres (87.36 km^{2}), was:

Year	1801	1811	1821	1831	1841
Population	746,233	856,412	1,011,948	1,180,292	1,353,345

== Registrar General returns ==
Under the direction of John Rickman, the bills of mortality area and the "five villages beyond the Bills"—consisting of the parishes of Chelsea, Kensington, Marylebone, Paddington and St Pancras— were designated the "Metropolis" in the 1801 to 1831 censuses.

From 11 January 1840, the bills were superseded by the Registrar General's weekly returns for the Metropolis, following the Births and Deaths Registration Act 1836. The weekly returns were based on death certificates, and therefore much more accurate than the bills of mortality based on burials. When the Registrar General began weekly returns in 1840 to the Metropolis defined in the 1831 census were added the parishes of Bow, Camberwell, Fulham, Hammersmith and the Greenwich Poor Law Union. This area was used for annual returns from 1837 and was the definition of the Metropolis in the 1841 census.

In 1844 the Wandsworth and Clapham Poor Law Union was added and in 1847 the parish of Hampstead and the Lewisham Poor Law Union were added to the weekly returns. This was the definition of the Metropolis used in the 1851 census. This area, with minor adjustments, (Note: Penge added 1855; Penge removed 1900; South Hornsey added 1900; North Woolwich removed 1965) became the district of the Metropolitan Board of Works in 1855, the County of London in 1889 and Inner London in 1965.
