= Westminster St James =

Former civil parish in London, England

Coordinates: 51°30′31″N 0°8′13″W

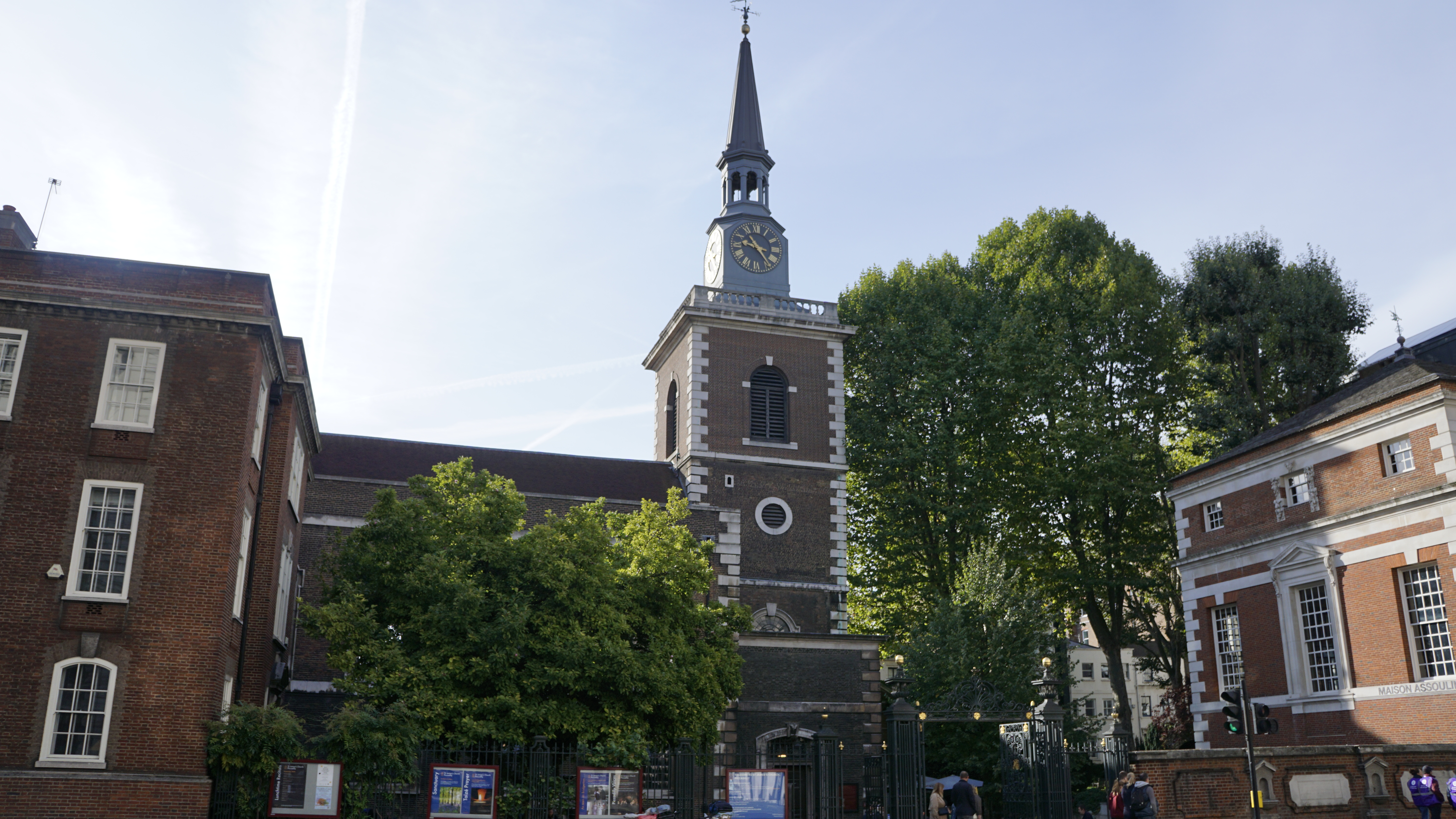

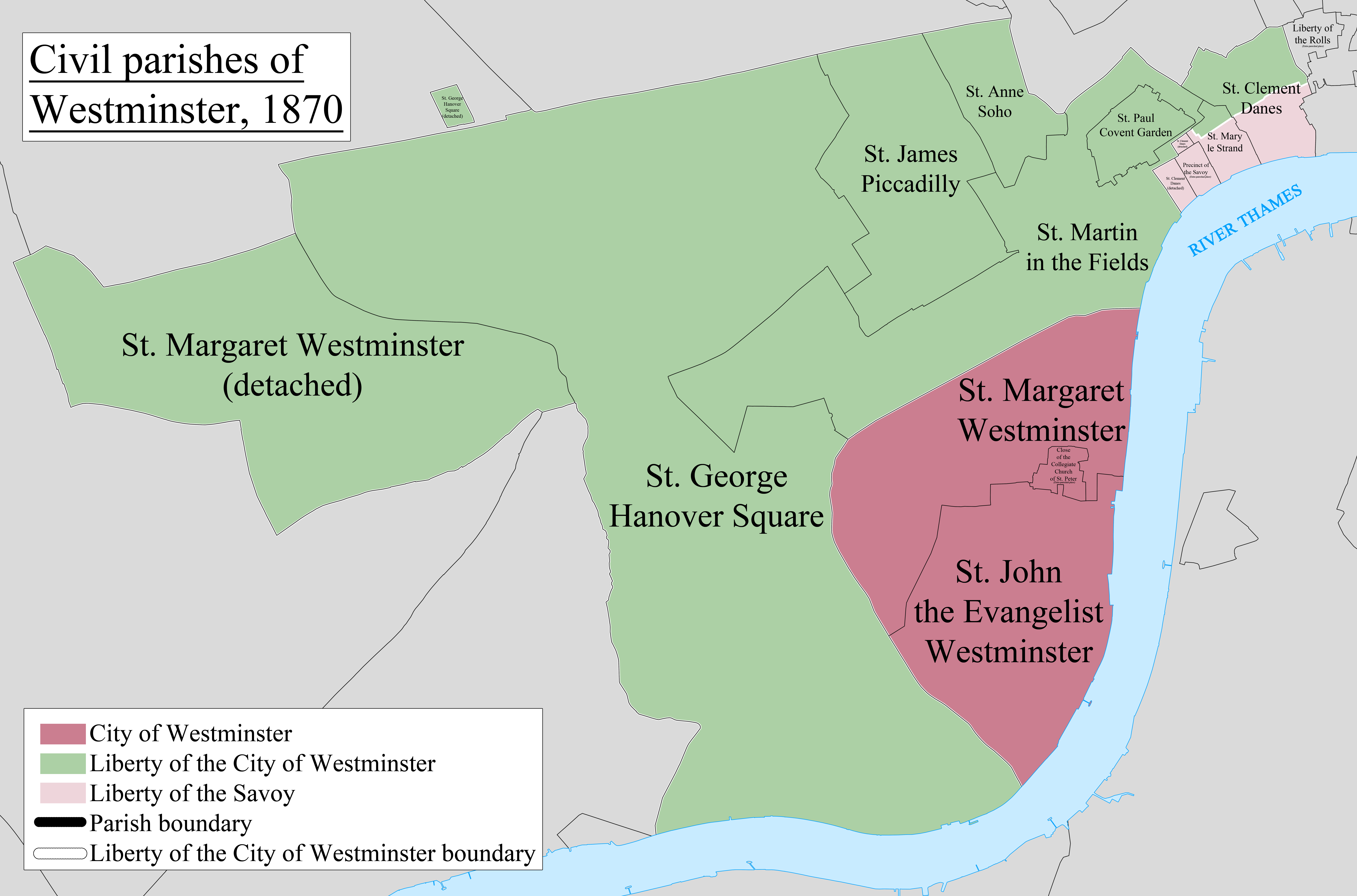
- Area
  - 1881: 815 acres (3.30 km^{2})
  - 1901: 766 acres (3.10 km^{2})
  - 1921: 767 acres (3.10 km^{2})
- Population
  - 1881: 29,941
  - 1901: 21,588
  - 1921: 13,644
- History
  - Origin: Bailiwick of St James
  - Created: 1685
  - Abolished: 1900 (vestry); 1922 (civil parish)
  - Succeeded by: City of Westminster
- Status: Civil parish
- Government: St James Vestry (1685–1900)
  - HQ: Vestry Hall, Piccadilly

Westminster St James (or St James Piccadilly) was a civil parish in the metropolitan area of London, England. The creation of the parish followed the building of the Church of St James, Piccadilly, in 1684. After several failed attempts, the parish was formed in 1685 from part of the ancient parish of St Martin in the Fields in the Liberty of Westminster and county of Middlesex. It included part of the West End of London, taking in sections of Soho, Mayfair and St James's. Civil parish administration was in the hands of a select vestry until the parish adopted the Vestries Act 1831. The vestry was reformed again by the Metropolis Management Act 1855. In 1889 the parish became part of the County of London and the vestry was abolished in 1900, replaced by Westminster City Council. The parish continued to have nominal existence until 1922. At the 1921 census (the last before the abolition of the parish), Westminster St James had a population of 13,644.

== Creation ==
There were attempts in 1664, 1668 and 1670 to create a new parish, with its own church, from the area of the bailiwick of St James within the ancient parish of St Martin in the Fields. The creation of the new parish was resisted by the vestry of St Martin in the Fields. In 1684 the Church of St James, Piccadilly, was constructed which improved the case for providing a new parish.

St. James' Parish, Westminster Act 1685
- Act of Parliament
- Parliament of England
- Long title: An Act for erecting a new Parish, to be called the Parish of St. James, within the Liberty of Westminster.
- Citation: 1 Ja. 2. c. 10 Pr.
- Territorial extent: England and Wales

Dates
- Royal assent: 27 June 1685
- Commencement: 19 May 1685 (Note: Start of session.)

Status: Current legislation

It was created by the St. James' Parish, Westminster Act 1685 (1 Ja. 2. c. 10 Pr.) from part of the ancient parish of St Martin in the Fields, and was within the Liberty of Westminster. The parish was included in the returns of the bills of mortality.

The legislation creating the parish in 1685 provided for a select vestry of 34 vestrymen.

== Geography ==
It corresponded to the western portion of the contemporary district of Soho, the eastern part of Mayfair and the northern part of St James's. To the north the boundary was along Oxford Street with St Marylebone, to the east it had a boundary with St Anne, Soho, running along Berwick Street and Rupert Street. To the south there was a boundary with St Martin in the Fields, roughly along Pall Mall. In the west there was a somewhat more irregular boundary with St George Hanover Square, partly following Conduit Street, Old Bond Street and Dover Street. The building of Regent Street in the early 19th century made the division of the parish between the Mayfair and Soho areas more defined.

== Government ==
The parish adopted the Vestries Act 1831 and on 6 April 1832 there was an election of vestrymen by all ratepayers. In 1855 the parish vestry became a local authority within the area of responsibility of the Metropolitan Board of Works and the number of elected vestrymen increased by 12.

Under the Metropolis Management Act 1855 any parish that exceeded 2,000 ratepayers was to be divided into wards; as such the incorporated vestry of St James Westminster was divided into four wards (electing vestrymen): No. 1 or Great Marlborough (12), No. 2 or Pall Mall (12), No. 3 or Church (15) and No. 4 or Golden Square (9).

The Local Government Act 1894 reformed the method of election for London vestries, with the entire vestry replaced at an election held on 15 December 1894. One third of the vestry was then elected every year starting in 1896.

== Poor law ==
The parish was independent for the administration of the New Poor Law, until it joined the Westminster Union in 1868.

== Abolition ==
In 1889 the parish became part of the County of London and in 1900 it became part of the Metropolitan Borough of Westminster, with the parish vestry replaced by Westminster City Council. On 1 April 1922 the parish was abolished to form City of Westminster.

== Population ==
The population of the parish as recorded in the decennial census was:

Year	1801	1811	1821	1831	1841	1851	1861	1871	1881	1891	1901	1911	1921
Population	34,462	34,093	33,819	37,053	37,398	36,406	?	33,619	29,941	24,995	21,588	16,159	13,644
