= St Mary le Strand (parish) =

Ancient parish in Middlesex, England

Coordinates: 51.512171°N 0.116904°W

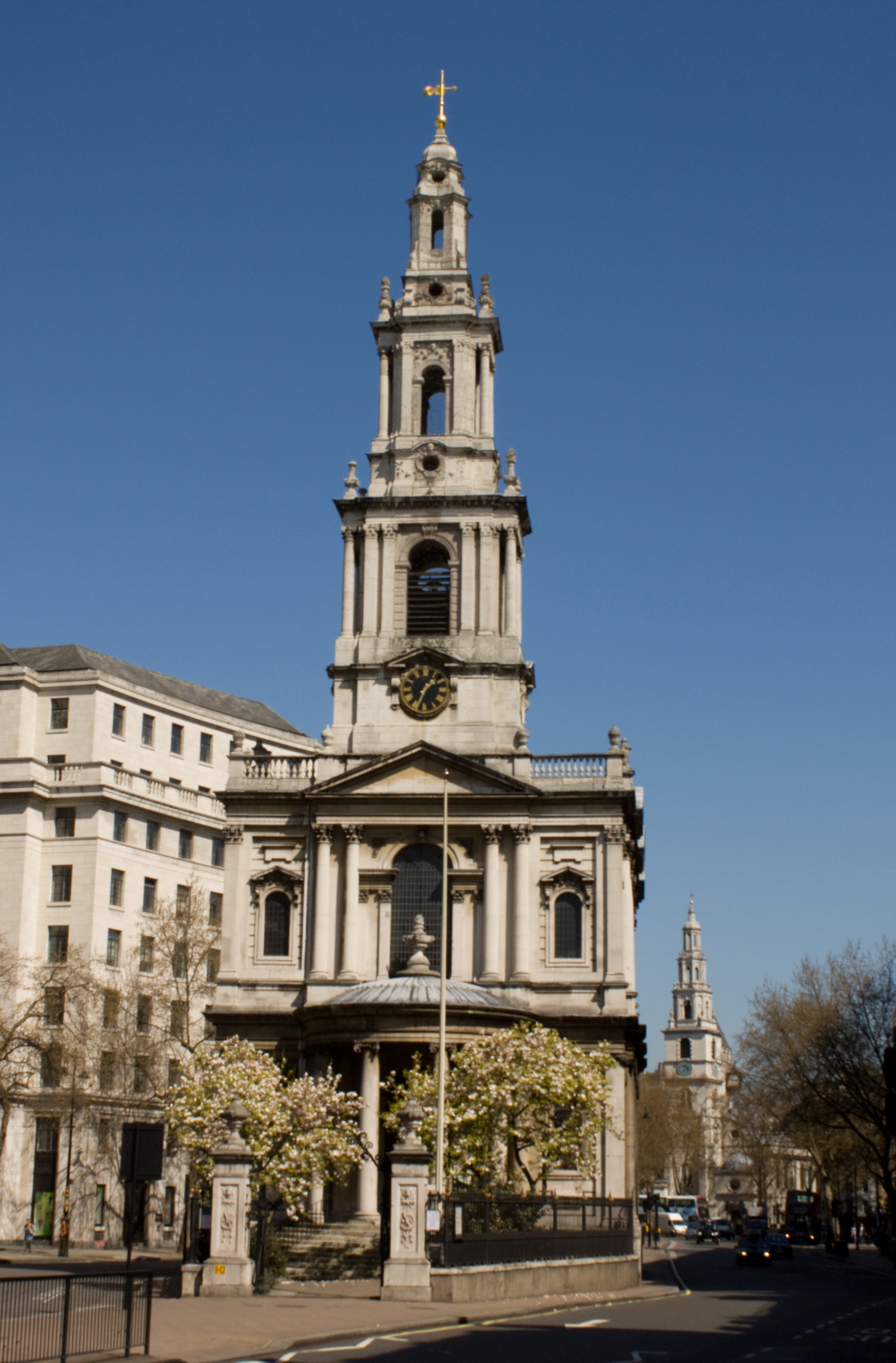

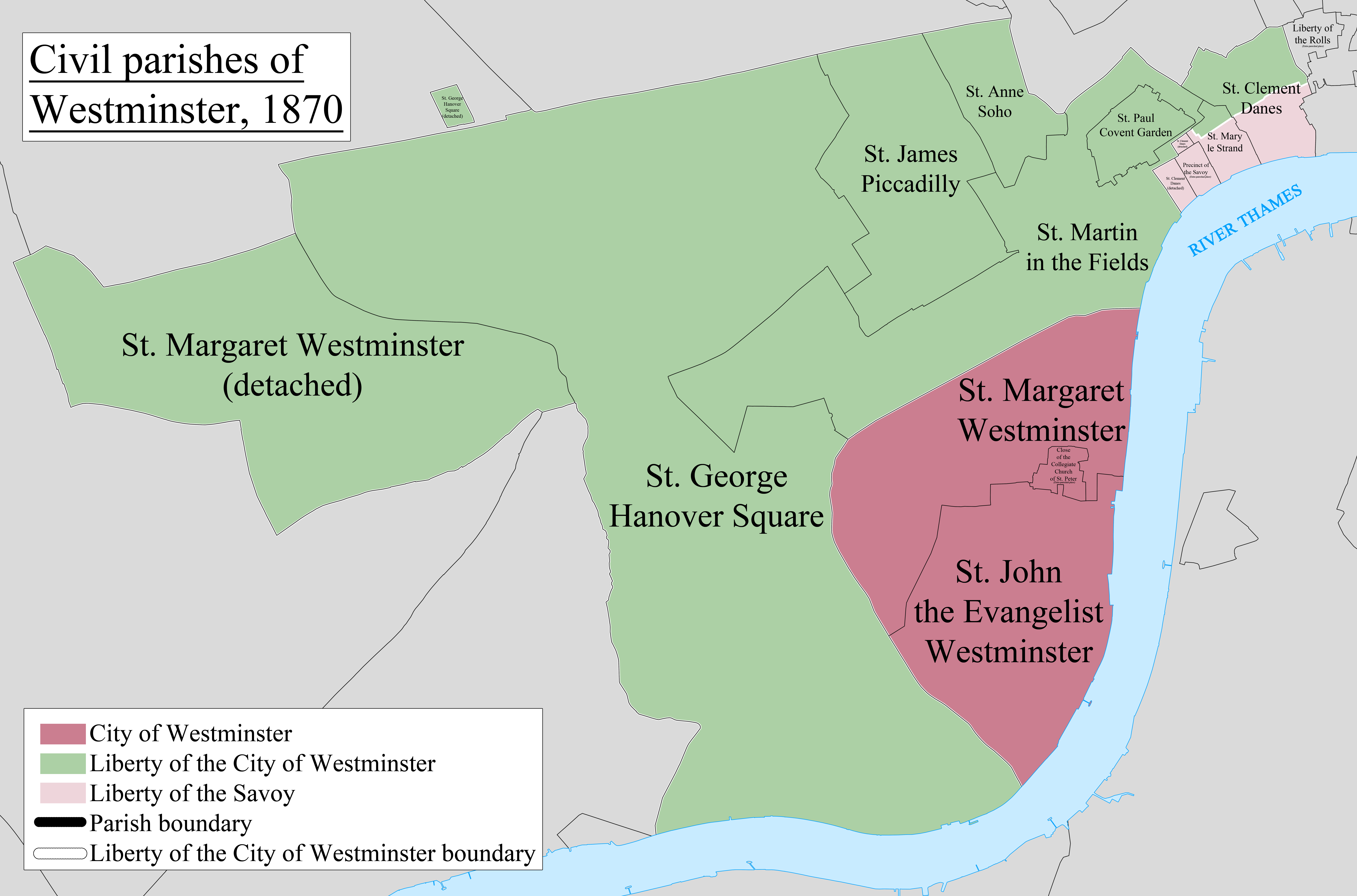
- Area
  - 1881: 15 acres (0.061 km^{2})
  - 1901/1921: 14 acres (0.057 km^{2})
- Population
  - 1881: 1,989
  - 1901: 494
  - 1921: 85
- History
  - Abolished: 1922
  - Succeeded by: City of Westminster
- Status: Civil parish
- Contained within
  - District: Strand (1855–1900)
  - Poor Law Union: Strand (1836–1913); City of Westminster (1913–1922)

St Mary le Strand was an ancient parish in the county of Middlesex, England. It was partly within the Liberty of the Savoy and partly within the Liberty of Westminster. It took its name from the church of St Mary and the Innocents. The church was demolished in 1548, during the construction of Somerset House, and not rebuilt until 1723. The parish was de facto merged with the Precinct of the Savoy as "St Mary Savoy", but an attempt to merge the parishes de jure in the early 18th century failed. It was restored as a separate parish following the construction of the New Church in the Strand in 1723. The parish was grouped into the Strand Poor Law Union in 1836 and the Strand District in 1855. In 1889 it became part of the County of London and from 1900 also part of the Metropolitan Borough of Westminster. It was abolished as a civil parish in 1922. At the 1921 census (the last before the abolition of the parish), St Mary le Strand had a population of 85.

== History ==
The ancient parish church of St Mary and the Innocents was demolished in 1548 when Somerset House was constructed. Edward Seymour, recently created Duke of Somerset, promised to provide a replacement, but none was ever built. The parish was not counted separately from 1549 to 1723. Parishioners initially used the church of St Clement Danes and then from 1558 the Savoy Chapel. The parish was de facto merged with the Precinct of the Savoy, becoming known as "St Mary Savoy". In 1606 "St Mary Savoy" was added to the returns of the Bills of mortality.

In 1702 the Savoy Hospital was closed and in 1703 Charles Sackville, 6th Earl of Dorset, attempted in parliament, as part of the Savoy Hospital Bill, to combine the parishes de jure. (Note: "Petition of Charles, E. Dorset and Middlesex, and of certain of his tenants, on behalf of themselves and the rest of the Earl's tenants in the parish of St. Mary-le-Strand, co. Middlesex. In the Bill for enabling her Majesty to settle the lands and revenues of the late dissolved hospital of the Savoy to such charitable and public uses as are therein mentioned, there are several clauses relating to the uniting the said parish to the precinct of the Savoy, by which Petitioners will be much prejudiced. Pray to be heard against these clauses.") This was opposed and never carried out. The parishioners of St Mary le Strand were made to renounce their claim before they were permitted to use the Savoy Chapel again. From 1700 to 1727 "St Mary Savoy in the Strand" appears in the bills of mortality. In 1723 a replacement New Church in the Strand was built by the Commission for Building Fifty New Churches. In the annual bills returns from 1726 there is an entry for St Mary le Strand and the Precinct of the Savoy appears separately from 1728.

== Governance ==
In 1836 the parish was grouped into the Strand Poor Law Union, with two guardians elected for the Westminster part and one guardian elected for the Duchy of Lancaster part. It was grouped into the Strand District in 1855 when it came within the area of responsibility of the Metropolitan Board of Works. In 1889 the parish became part of the County of London and in 1900 it became part of the Metropolitan Borough of Westminster. On 1 April 1922 the parish was abolished to form City of Westminster.

== Geography ==
It had a southern boundary with the River Thames. The part within the Liberty of Westminster was north of the Strand and the part within the Liberty of the Savoy was primarily to the south of the Strand.

== Population ==
The population of St Mary le Strand at the decennial census was:

Year	1801	1811	1821	1831	1841	1851	1871	1881	1891	1901	1911	1921
Population	1,704	1,578	1,784	2,052	2,520	2,517	2,007	1,989	1,549	494	74	85
