= Precinct of the Savoy =

Coordinates: 51.5097°N 0.1200°W

Precinct of the Savoy Savoy St John the Baptist
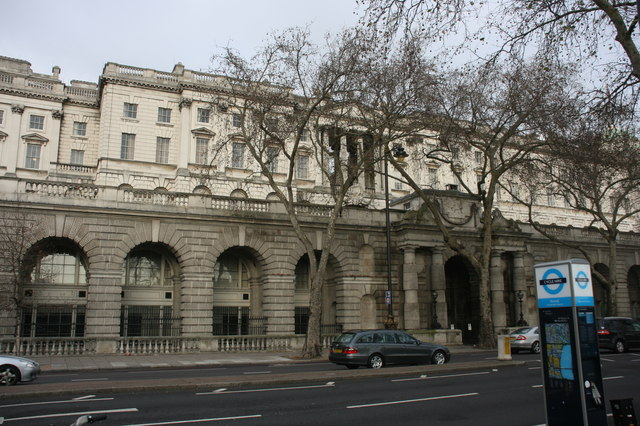

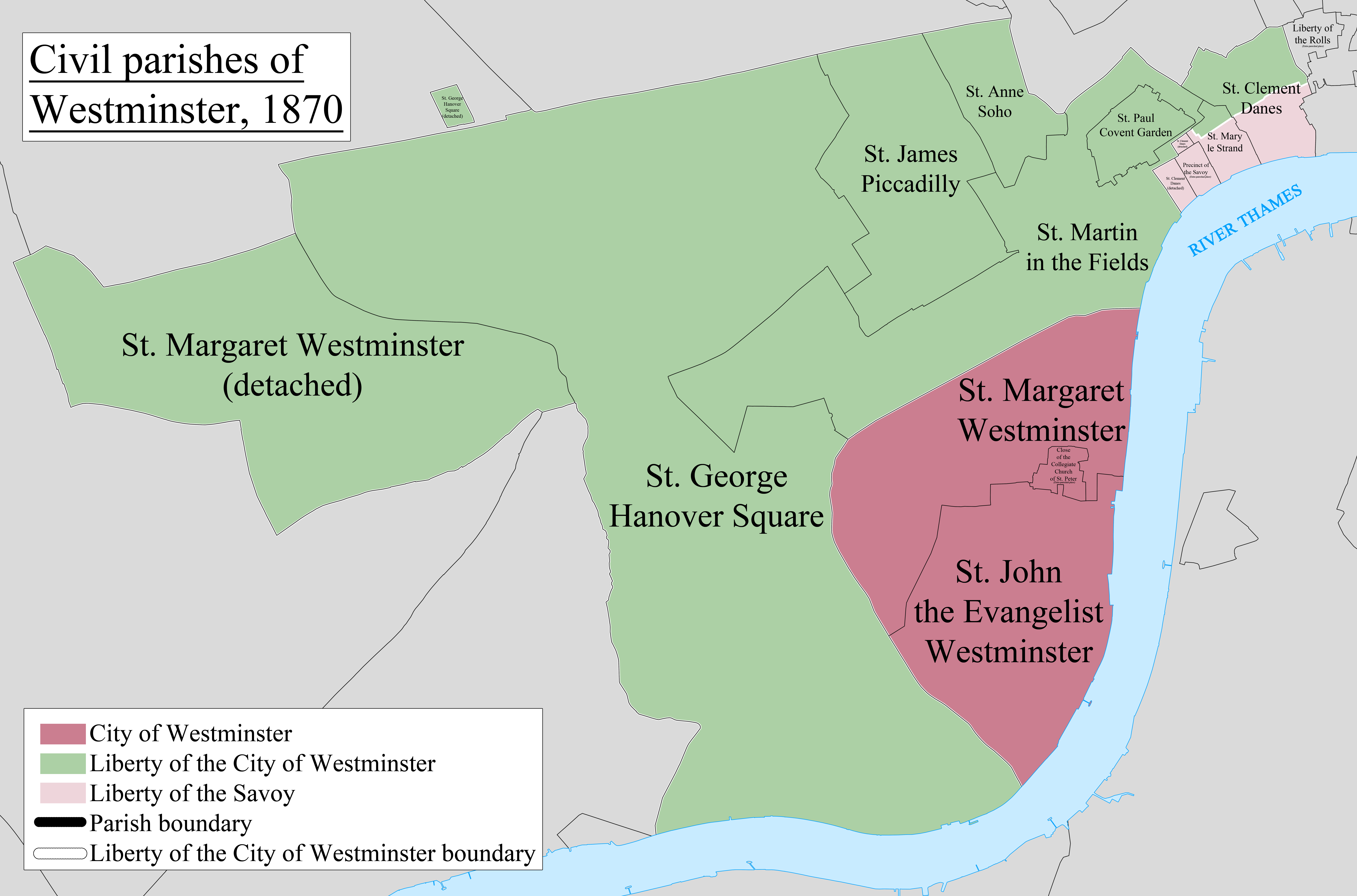
- Area
  - 1881–1921: 7 acres (0.028 km^{2})
- Population
  - 1881: 245
  - 1901: 166
  - 1921: 33
- Density
  - 1881: 35/acre
  - 1901: 24/acre
  - 1921: 5/acre
- History
  - Abolished: 1922
  - Succeeded by: City of Westminster
- Status: Extra-parochial area Civil parish (1866 – 1922)
- Contained within
  - District: Strand (1855–1900)
  - Poor Law Union: Strand (1836–1913); City of Westminster (1913–1922)

The Precinct of the Savoy, also known as Savoy St John the Baptist, was a component of the Liberty of the Savoy in the county of Middlesex, England, located between the Strand and the River Thames. Formerly extra-parochial, it was a civil parish between 1866 and 1922. It now forms part of the City of Westminster in Greater London.

== Geography ==
The area was occupied by the Savoy Palace, the Savoy Hospital and the King's Chapel of the Savoy.

To the south it had a boundary with the River Thames, to the east with the parish of St Mary le Strand, to the west and north with the parish of St Clement Danes. The boundary in the north was formed by the Strand. It was within the Savoy ward of the Liberty of the Savoy.

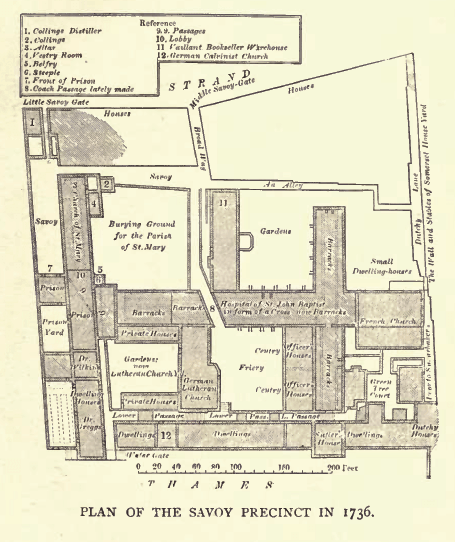

== Governance ==
The precinct of the Savoy formed part of the Liberty of the Savoy and was part of the Duchy of Lancaster.

The parish was effectively merged with St Mary le Strand from 1564 to 1727 when the inhabitants shared the Savoy Chapel, becoming known as "St Mary Savoy" and appearing in the bills of mortality from 1606. In the early 18th century an attempt was made to formally combine the parishes. This was opposed and never carried out. The parishioners of St Mary le Strand were made to renounce their claim before they were permitted to use the Savoy Chapel again. The matter was finally resolved when a new church of St Mary le Strand was constructed. "Precinct of the Savoy" appears in the bills of mortality from 1728.

In 1855 the precinct of the Savoy was included within the area of the Strand District and became part of the Metropolitan Borough of Westminster in 1900. On 1 April 1922 the parish was abolished to form City of Westminster. At the 1921 census (the last before the abolition of the parish), Precinct of the Savoy had a population of 33.

It now forms part of the City of Westminster London borough in Greater London.
