= St Anne Within the Liberty of Westminster =

- Civil parish
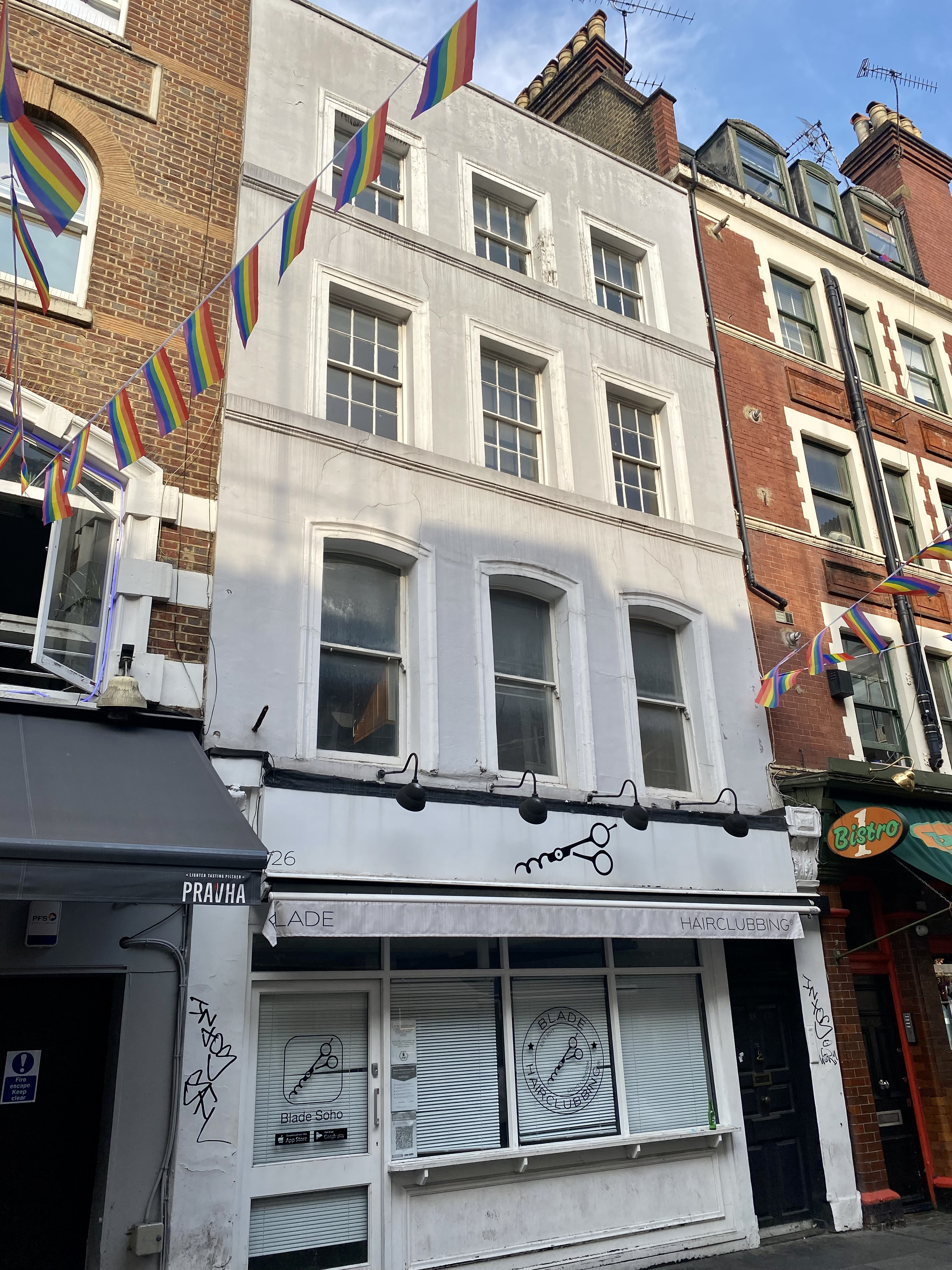

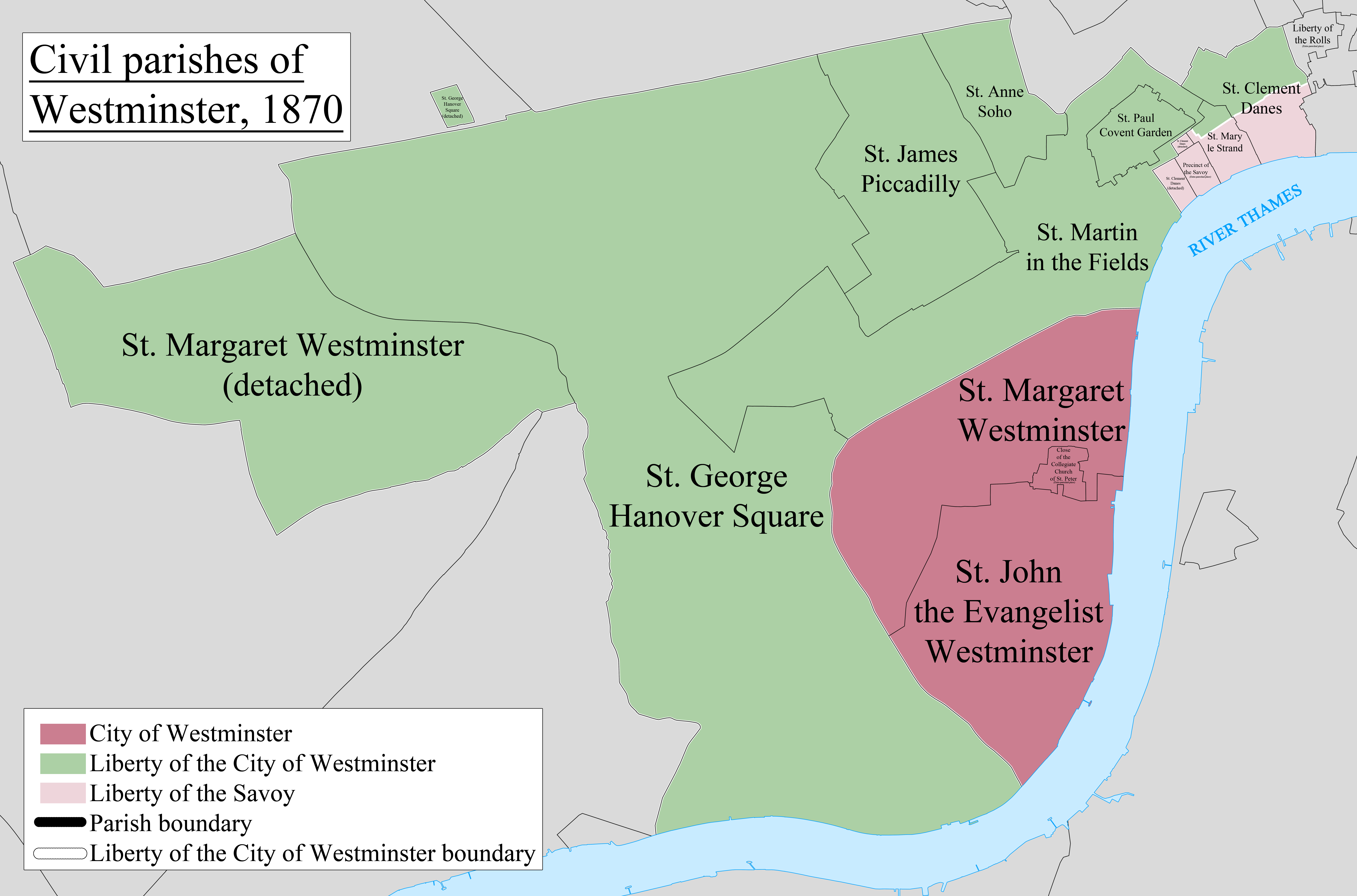
- Area
  - 1881: 54 acres (0.22 km^{2})
- Population
  - 1881: 16,608
  - 1901: 11,493
  - 1921: 6,699
- History
  - Preceded by: St Martin in the Fields
  - Created: 1687
  - Abolished: 1922
  - Succeeded by: City of Westminster
- Status: Civil parish (1687–1922)
- Government: St Anne Vestry (1687–1900)
  - HQ: Vestry Hall, Dean Street, Soho
- Contained within
  - District: Strand (1855–1900)
  - Poor Law Union: Strand (1837–1868); Westminster (1868–1913); City of Westminster (1913–1922)

St Anne Within the Liberty of Westminster, also known as St Anne Soho, was a civil parish in the county of Middlesex, later part of the new County of London, England.

The parish was formed in 1687 from part of the ancient parish of St Martin in the Fields in the Liberty of Westminster. It included the eastern section of the contemporary districts of Soho to the north of Shaftesbury Avenue and Chinatown to the south of it. The creation of the parish accompanied the building of St Anne's Church, Soho, to meet the demands of a growing population. Initially controlled by a select vestry, the parish was governed by an open vestry of all inhabitants until 1855, when the vestry was superseded for most purposes by the Strand District Board of Works. In 1889 the parish became part of the County of London, and in 1900 the local authority became Westminster City Council.

St Anne Soho continued to exist as a civil parish until 1922. At the 1921 census (the last before the abolition of the parish), St Anne Within the Liberty of Westminster had a population of 6699.

== Creation ==
It was created in 1687 from part of the ancient parish of St Martin in the Fields, and was within the Liberty of Westminster. The parish was included in the returns of the bills of mortality. The creation of the new parish followed the building of the St Anne's Church, Soho and required a private act of Parliament, the Creation of St. Anne's Parish, Westminster Act 1678 (30 Cha. 2. c. 16 Pr.), which received royal assent on 15 July 1678. A further act, the St. Anne's Parish, Westminster Act 1685 (1 Ja. 2. c. 1 Pr.) was required to finance and build the church, and a commission of local inhabitants was created for this purpose. The church was completed and the commission became the select vestry of the parish. However, the select vestry was not constituted in the 1678 act creating the parish and was challenged. By 21 May 1744 the parish was governed by an open vestry of all parishioners.

== Government ==
A map showing the St Anne ward of Westminster Metropolitan Borough as it appeared in 1916.

The parish vestry of St Anne's had responsibility for the church, poor relief, and certain civil functions. These included street paving, sanitation, lighting the streets, watching, and the prevention of fire. In common with other parishes, these functions were absorbed by ad hoc authorities as local government was reformed.

== Reform ==
It was grouped into the Strand District in 1855, when it came within the area of responsibility of the Metropolitan Board of Works. It was an exclave of the district, with the main part located to the southeast and adjacent to the River Thames. The parish elected twenty-four vestrymen to the Strand District Board of Works.

In 1889 the parish became part of the County of London and in 1900 it became part of the Metropolitan Borough of Westminster. It was abolished as a civil parish in 1922.

== Geography ==
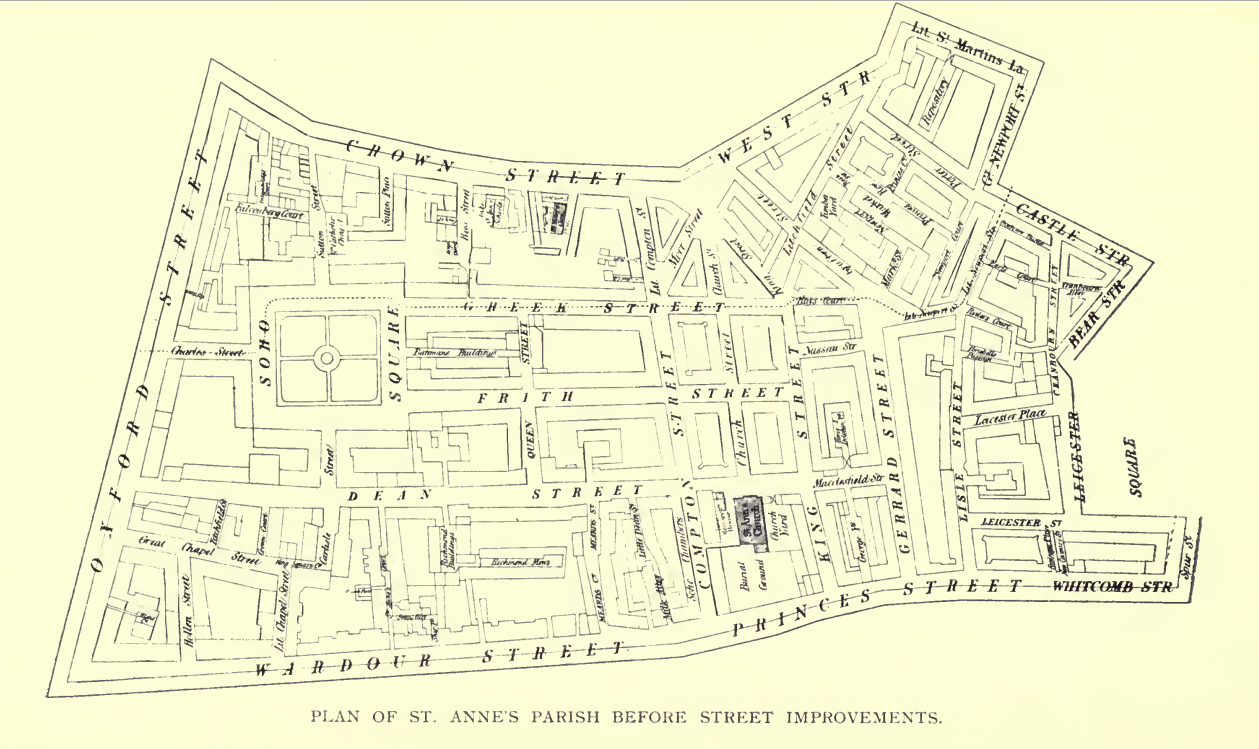
Plan of the parish of St Anne

The northern boundary was Oxford Street, the western boundary was Berwick Street/Rupert Street, to the south was an irregular boundary around Leicester Square, and the eastern boundary was to the west of Charing Cross Road north of Cambridge Circus and to the east of it to the south. In modern terms it corresponded to the eastern section of Soho including Chinatown.

== Poor law ==
After the introduction of the New Poor Law, the parish was part of the Strand poor law union from 1836 to 1868. It formed part of the Westminster union from 1868 to 1913 and the City of Westminster union from 1913. When the parish of St Anne was abolished on 1 April 1922 it was merged with other parishes to form the City of Westminster parish for poor law purposes.

== Population ==
The population at each census was:

Year	1801	1811	1821	1831	1841	1851	1861	1871	1881	1891	1901	1911	1921
Population	11,637	12,288	15,215	15,600	16,480	17,335	17,426	17,562	16,608	12,317	11,493	9,286	6,699
