= St Martin in the Fields (parish) =

Former civil parish in the Liberty of Westminster, England

- Civil parish
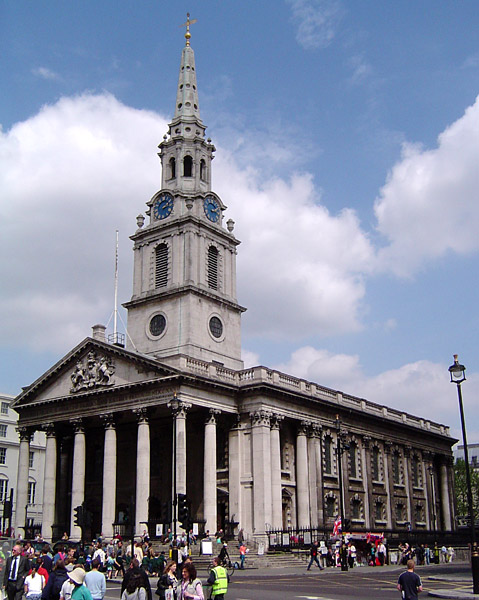

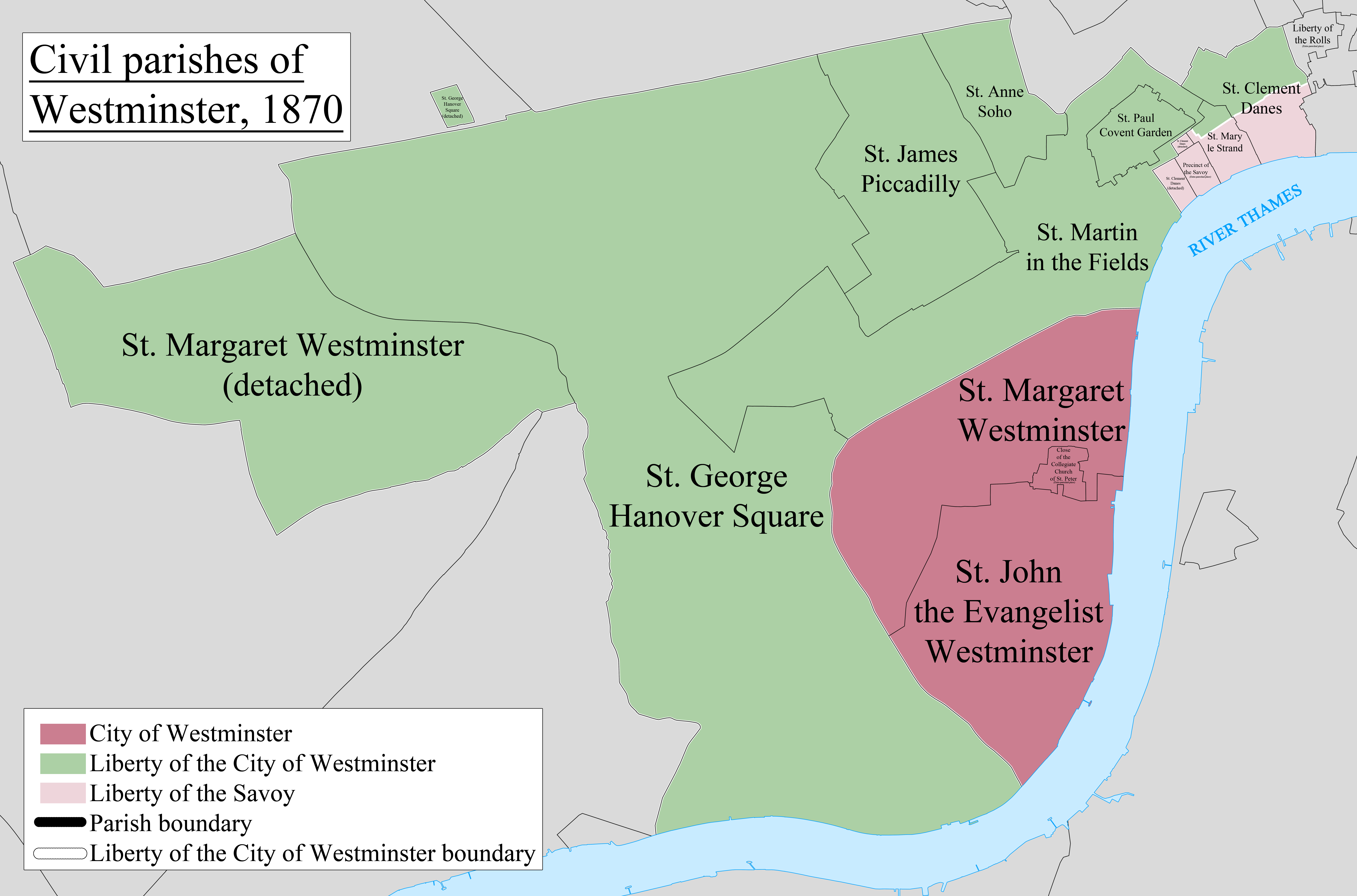
- Area
  - 1881/1921: 286 acres (1.16 km^{2})
- Population
  - 1881: 17,508
  - 1901: 12,980
  - 1921: 10,666
- History
  - Origin: Ancient parish
  - Abolished: 1922
  - Succeeded by: City of Westminster
- Status: Civil parish
- Government: St Martin in the Fields Vestry
  - HQ: Vestry Hall, St Martin's Place
- Contained within
  - Poor Law Union: Strand (1868–1913); City of Westminster (1913–1922)
- Today part of: City of Westminster

St Martin in the Fields was a civil parish in the county of Middlesex, later part of the new County of London, England. It took its name from the Church of St Martin-in-the-Fields and was within the Liberty of Westminster. Within its boundaries were the former extra-parochial areas of Buckingham Palace and St James's Palace. At the 1921 census (the last before the abolition of the parish), St Martin in the Fields had a population of 10,666.

== Geography ==
St Martin in the Fields was an ancient parish. In 1542, it gained the "lands between the church of St Clement Danes and the Palace of Westminster" from the parish of Westminster St Margaret.

The parish originally included a number of areas that were carved out between 1645 and 1724 to create new parishes:

Year	Parish	Localities
1645	St Paul Covent Garden	Covent Garden
1685	Westminster St James	Piccadilly
1687	St Anne Soho	Soho
1724	St George Hanover Square	Belgravia, Mayfair, Pimlico

== The vestry ==
In 1855, the parish vestry became a local authority within the area of responsibility of the Metropolitan Board of Works. Under the Metropolis Management Act 1855, any parish that exceeded 2,000 ratepayers was to be divided into wards; as such, the incorporated vestry of St Martin in the Fields was divided into three wards (electing vestrymen): No. 1 (12), No. 2 (12) and No. 3 (12). In 1896, as the population of the parish had increased, the incorporated vestry was re-divided into three new wards (electing vestrymen): Park (15), Long Acre (12) and Embankment (9).

== Poor law ==
St. Martin in the Fields (Poor Relief) Act 1770
- Act of Parliament
- Parliament of Great Britain
- Long title: An Act for building a Workhouse in the Parish of Saint Martin in the Fields, within the Liberty of Westminster, in the County of Middlesex.
- Citation: 10 Geo. 3. c. 75
- Territorial extent: Great Britain

Dates
- Royal assent: 29 March 1770
- Commencement: 9 January 1770 (Note: Start of session.)
- Repealed
Other legislation
Amended by	Workhouse (Westminster) Act 1772
Repealed by	London Government (City of Westminster) Order in Council 1901

Status: Repealed

Text of statute as originally enacted

Workhouse (Westminster) Act 1772
- Act of Parliament
- Parliament of Great Britain
- Long title: An Act to amend an Act of the Tenth Year of the Reign of His present Majesty, for building a Workhouse in the Parish of Saint Martin in the Fields, within the City of Westminster, in the County of Middlesex.
- Citation: 12 Geo. 3. c. 34
- Territorial extent: Great Britain

Dates
- Royal assent: 21 May 1772
- Commencement: 21 January 1772
- Repealed
Other legislation
Amends	St. Martin in the Fields (Poor Relief) Act 1770
Repealed by	London Government (City of Westminster) Order in Council 1901

Status: Repealed

Text of statute as originally enacted

St Martin in the Fields had a parish workhouse since 1724 sited on an old burial ground between Hemmings Row, Dukes Court, St Martin's Place and Castle Street. 51°30′33″N 0°07′41″W It was enlarged in 1772 under the St. Martin in the Fields (Poor Relief) Act 1770 (10 Geo. 3. c. 75) and the Workhouse (Westminster) Act 1772 (12 Geo. 3. c. 34). It was demolished in 1871, for an extension to the National Gallery.

St Martin in the Fields was a single parish for the poor law, following the Poor Law Amendment Act 1834, until 1868, when it became part of the Strand Poor Law Union.

== Reform ==
In 1889, the parish became part of the new County of London, and in 1900, it became part of the Metropolitan Borough of Westminster. The St Martin in the Fields Vestry was replaced by Westminster City Council, and the vestry hall became Westminster City Hall. On 1 April 1922 the parish was abolished to form City of Westminster.
