= Population of Middlesex (1801–1881) =

The following is the population of the historic county of Middlesex (including the City of London) as given at each ten-yearly census from 1801 to 1881:

Year	Edmonton Hundred	Elthorne Hundred	Gore Hundred	Isleworth Hundred	Ossulstone Hundred				Spelthorne Hundred	London City		Inns of Court and Chancery	Westminster City and Liberty	Total
Year	Edmonton Hundred	Elthorne Hundred	Gore Hundred	Isleworth Hundred	Holborn Division	Finsbury Division	Kensington Division	Tower Division	Spelthorne Hundred	Within the Walls	Without the Walls	Inns of Court and Chancery	Westminster City and Liberty	Total
1801	16,885	12,959	6,968	9,266	171,202	73,268	40,642	189,937	10,228	63,832	63,145	1,907	157,890	818,129
1811	20,577	15,266	8,738	10,669	214,946	92,538	54,550	238,089	11,655	55,484	63,027	1,796	166,438	953,774
1821	24,771	17,843	9,806	12,285	272,131	119,802	70,808	292,330	13,417	56,174	67,034	1,546	186,584	1,144,531
1831	26,930	20,091	11,315	13,568	341,981	151,409	87,961	360,372	15,212	55,778	66,126	1,271	206,116	1,358,130
1841	30,683	25,697	12,487	15,893	399,218	185,174	109,342	428,657	16,587	54,626	68,103	1,708	226,241	1,574,416
1851	32,109	26,240	12,956	18,463	480,942	239,788	151,557	537,139	17,305	54,702	72,527	1,398	241,450	1,886,576
1861	40,885	31,516	15,341	23,610	551,487	312,553	198,786	645,677	19,440	44,400	67,055	1,272	254,463	2,206,485
1871	57,332	35,395	21,291	30,463	604,891	381,702	307,997	751,754	26,947	28,093	46,170	1,138	246,592	2,539,765
1881	94,185	39,291	27,029	35,206	622,865	482,264	452,183	853,903	33,460	18,851	28,873	1,011	228,993	2,920,485*

* The figures for 1881 in the source do not cross-cast precisely. The source gives figures for a very large number of subdivisions of the hundreds etc., including parishes and many small extra-parochial areas, especially in and around the City of London. The treatments from one census to the next are not precisely consistent.
