= Metropolitan Police District =

Policing area of the Metropolitan Police Service in Greater London

- Police area
- Metropolitan Police District and English police areas (City of London police area not shown)
- Status: Police area
- Established: 1829

Area
  - Total: 1,578 km^{2} (609 sq mi)

Population
  - Total: 9,000,000
  - Density: 5,700/km^{2} (15,000/sq mi)
- Police: Metropolitan Police Service

The Metropolitan Police District (MPD) is the police area which is policed by the Metropolitan Police Service in London. It currently consists of the ceremonial county of Greater London, which excludes the City of London. The Metropolitan Police District was created by the Metropolitan Police Act 1829 as an ad hoc area of administration because the built-up area of London spread at the time into many parishes and counties without an established boundary. The district expanded as the built up area grew and stretched some distance into rural land. When county police forces were set up in England, those of Essex, Hertfordshire, Kent and Surrey did not cover the parts of the counties within the MPD, while Middlesex did not have a county force. Similarly, boroughs in the MPD that elsewhere would have been entitled to their own police force did not have them.

The MPD was originally defined in reference to civil parishes and in 1946 was altered to correspond to local government districts. The MPD has been used for other purposes during its existence, such as the boundary for coal tax and as a 'Greater London' statistical unit. When the Greater London Council was established in 1965, the MPD was expanded to include all of its territory, though some areas that did not become part of Greater London continued to be within it. In 2000, when the Greater London Authority was formed, the outer boundary of the MPD was retracted to coincide with Greater London and the neighbouring county forces then became responsible for those areas outside Greater London. The MPD now consists of the 32 boroughs of Greater London (including the City of Westminster), while the City of London is served by the City of London Police.

== History ==
=== Creation ===
The Metropolitan Police District was defined in the schedule of the Metropolitan Police Act 1829 as an approximately circular area within a seven-mile (11-kilometre) radius of Charing Cross, which was divided into 17 divisions, which were later grouped into four districts (1869-1970) or areas (1970-1985).

It consisted of parts of:

Middlesex	The City and Liberty of Westminster, The Holborn division, the inner parishes of the Finsbury division, the Tower division, the Kensington division, the township of New Brentford, the Inns of Court and the liberty of Ely Place
Kent	The parishes of St Paul and St Nicholas, Deptford, and the parish of Greenwich
Surrey	The parishes of Bermondsey, Camberwell, Clapham, Lambeth, Newington, Putney, Rotherhithe, Streatham, Tooting, Wandsworth, and Christchurch, Southwark, The Liberty of the Clink, The hamlet of Hatcham, and the Borough of Southwark

=== 1840 revision ===
There have been numerous changes to the boundaries of the MPD, and of the divisions therein. The Metropolitan Police Act 1839 recognised that the "boundary is... very irregular" and made it lawful to add any place in the Central Criminal Court District and also "any part of any parish, township, precinct or place" not more than 15 miles (24 km) from Charing Cross. The enlarged district encompassed the metropolitan area and some parts of Essex, Kent, Hertfordshire and Surrey. The 1911 Encyclopædia Britannica notes that it included "those civil parishes [...] of which any part is within twelve miles (19 km) of, or of which no part is more than fifteen miles (24 km) from, Charing Cross".

Metropolitan Police District 1840–1946

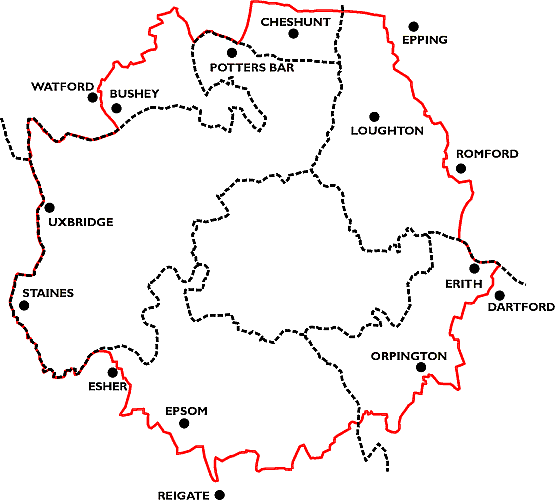

The map shows the MPD boundary in red. At the centre is the area of the Metropolitan Board of Works 1855–1889, which became the County of London in 1889. The other dashed lines show the boundaries of Essex (containing Loughton), Kent, Surrey, Middlesex, and Hertfordshire (going clockwise).

The enlargement under the 1839 Act was carried out by Order in Council made on 3 January 1840, which listed the following "parishes, townships, precincts, and places" ... "should be added to, and form part of, the metropolitan police district":

County of Middlesex	Ashford, Bedfont (East), Cowley, Cranford, Drayton (West), Edgware (sic) including Whitchurch, Edmonton, Enfield, Feltham, Finchley, Fryern Barnet, Greenford, Hadley (Monken), Hampton (Town and Court), Hamptonwick liberty (sic), Hanwell, Hanworth, Harefield, Harlington, Harmondsworth, Harrow, Hayes, Hendon, Heston, Hillingdon, Hornsey, Ickenham, Isleworth, Kingsbury, Laleham, Littleton, Northolt, Norwood precinct, Perivale, Pinner, Ruislip, Shepperton, South Mimms, Staines, Stanmore (Great and Little), Stanwell, Sunbury, Teddington, Tottenham, Twickenham, Twyford Abbey, Uxbridge township and chapelry, Wilsden (sic)
County of Surrey	Addington, Banstead, Beddington and Wallington hamlet, Carshalton, Cheam, Chessington, Croydon, Cuddington, Epsom, Ewell exclusive of part near Walton, Farley, Kew, Kingston upon Thames, Ham-with-Hatch hamlet, Hook hamlet, Long Ditton, Maldon (sic), Merton, Mitcham, Morden, Mortlake, Molesey (East), Molesey (West), Petersham, Richmond, Roehampton, Sanderstead, Sutton, Thames Ditton including hamlet of Ember, hamlet of Weston, and hamlet of Claygate, Warlingham, Wimbledon, Woodmansterne, Worcester Park (extra-parochial)
County of Kent	Beckenham, Bexley, Bromley, Charlton, Chislehurst, Crayford, Downe (sic), Eltham including Mottingham, Erith, Farnborough, Foots Cray, Hayes, Keston, Kidbrooke, Lee, Lewisham, North Cray, Orpington, Plumstead, St Mary Cray, Wickham (East), Wickham (West), Woolwich
County of Essex	Barking (Town Ward, Chadwell Ward, Great Ilford Ward, Ripple Ward), Chigwell, Chingford, Dagenham, East Ham, Little Ilford, Loughton, Low Leyton, Waltham Abbey (Holyfield hamlet, Sewardstone hamlet, Upshire hamlet, Waltham Town hamlet), Walthamstow, Wanstead, West Ham (Church-street Ward, Plaistow Ward, Stratford Ward), Woodford
County of Hertford	Aldenham, Bushey, Cheshunt, Chipping Barnet, East Barnet, Elstree, Northaw, Ridge, Shenley, Theobald-street, Totteridge

=== 1946 revision ===
In 1946 the Metropolitan Police District was somewhat redrawn by the Police Act 1946, to match the then local government boundaries. The boroughs of Dartford and Watford, the urban district of Caterham and Warlingham and the parish of St. Peter Rural were wholly excluded from the District; whilst the borough of Epsom and Ewell, the urban districts of Banstead, Cheshunt, Coulsdon and Purley, Crayford, Esher and Orpington were brought wholly within the district. The definition, in the Fourth Schedule is as follows:

County of London except the City of London
Middlesex
County Borough of Croydon, County Borough of East Ham, County Borough of West Ham
Essex	Municipal Borough of Barking, Municipal Borough of Chingford, Municipal Borough of Dagenham, Municipal Borough of Ilford, Municipal Borough of Walthamstow, Municipal Borough of Wanstead and Woodford, Chigwell Urban District, Waltham Holy Cross Urban District
Hertfordshire	Barnet Urban District, Bushey Urban District, Cheshunt Urban District, East Barnet Urban District, Elstree Rural District the parish of Northaw from Hatfield Rural District; Aldenham from Watford Rural District
Kent	Municipal Borough of Beckenham, Municipal Borough of Bexley, Municipal Borough of Bromley, Municipal Borough of Erith, Chislehurst and Sidcup Urban District, Crayford Urban District, Orpington Urban District, Penge Urban District
Surrey	Municipal Borough of Barnes, Municipal Borough of Beddington and Wallington, Municipal Borough of Epsom and Ewell, Municipal Borough of Kingston-upon-Thames, Municipal Borough of Malden and Coombe, Municipal Borough of Mitcham, Municipal Borough of Richmond, Municipal Borough of Surbiton, Municipal Borough of Sutton and Cheam, Municipal Borough of Wimbledon, Banstead Urban District, Carshalton Urban District, Coulsdon and Purley Urban District, Esher Urban District, Merton and Morden Urban District

=== 1965 revision ===
In 1965 the administrative boundaries of London were extended. After 1965 the newly created Greater London more closely matched the MPD, and the MPD was defined again by section 76 of the London Government Act 1963. The former area of the Municipal Borough of Romford and Hornchurch Urban District, which had not previously been covered by the MPD but were now in Greater London, were added. The revised MPD included some areas that did not become part of Greater London.

In 1974 it was again restated as:

- Greater London, excluding the City of London and the Temples
- Essex: Epping Forest : former Chigwell Urban District and parish of Waltham Holy Cross
- Hertfordshire:
  - Broxbourne : former Cheshunt Urban District
  - Hertsmere
  - Welwyn Hatfield: parish of Northaw (renamed Northaw and Cuffley in 1982)
- Surrey:
  - Elmbridge: former Esher Urban District
  - Epsom and Ewell
  - Spelthorne
  - Reigate and Banstead: former Banstead Urban District

=== 1990s revision ===
Following the first periodic review of Greater London and the London boroughs by the Local Government Boundary Commission for England, changes were made to the City of London Police and MPD boundary on 1 April 1994, with several exchanges of territory.

=== 2000 revision ===
In 1998 the Government 'Green Paper' on the Greater London Authority proposed to create a police authority for the Metropolitan Police, who had previously been under the control of the Home Secretary. Initially, the government proposed to retain the areas outside the local government boundary, with a representative appointed to the Metropolitan Police Authority from the councils outside the Greater London Authority boundary.

However the government changed its mind and in the Greater London Authority Act 1999, the boundaries of the Metropolitan Police District were redefined to match Greater London. The excised county areas were reassigned to Essex Police, Hertfordshire Constabulary and Surrey Police.

=== Use for other purposes ===
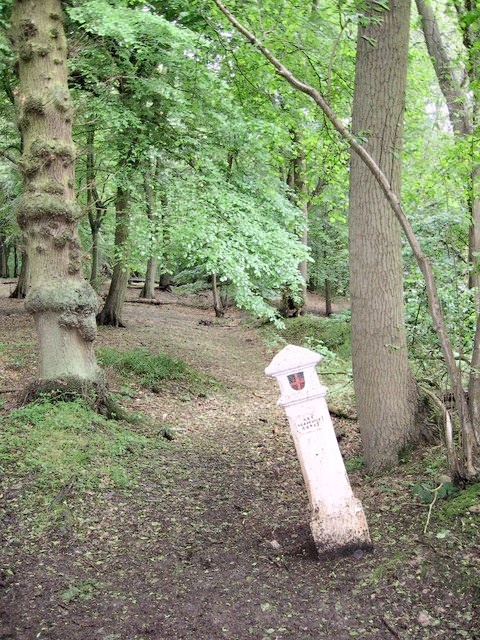
Coal-tax post on a footpath in Wormley Wood, Hertfordshire

The London Coal and Wine Duties Continuance Act 1861 aligned the coal tax boundary to the MPD and a series of coal-tax posts can be found along the boundary as it existed at that time.

During the 20th century the population of the County of London was in decline and the London population was growing in the outer suburbs within the MPD. During this period the MPD was used as a definition of 'Greater London'. 1901 Census is an example of this.

== Exceptions ==
Not all parts of Greater London, although within the boundaries of the MPD, are policed by the Metropolitan Police. The Greater London Authority Act 1999 defines the Metropolitan Police District as consisting of "Greater London, excluding the City of London, the Inner Temple and the Middle Temple." The City of London has its own police force, the City of London Police, which also covers the Inner and Middle Temples. As constables of both forces are empowered throughout England and Wales, mutual assistance is a routine matter. The City of London has limited policing jurisdiction with parks constabularies within their lands at Hampstead Heath and Epping Forest (constables are attested under the Ministry of Housing and Local Government Provisional Order Confirmation (Greater London Parks and Open Spaces) Act 1967 (c. xxix) and the Epping Forest Act 1878 respectively, and not under the Police Acts as members of the City of London Police).

The London Underground and the lines and stations of the national railway network within the MPD are primarily policed by the British Transport Police but are not excluded from the jurisdiction of the Metropolitan Police.

The Royal Parks of London used to be policed by the Royal Parks Constabulary (RPC) whose powers derived from the Parks Regulation Act 1872. The Serious Organised Crime and Police Act 2005 abolished the RPC in England and Wales and provided for the transfer of personnel within Greater London into the Metropolitan Police, leaving the Royal Parks within the general jurisdiction of the Metropolitan Police.

The Ministry of Defence Police is responsible for policing a few Ministry of Defence buildings and property within the MPD. As with the BTP, their jurisdiction is not to the exclusion of the Metropolitan Police who have statutory responsibility for providing policing to the entire MPD.
