= Tower Hamlets Cemetery Park =

Cemetery and nature reserve in London

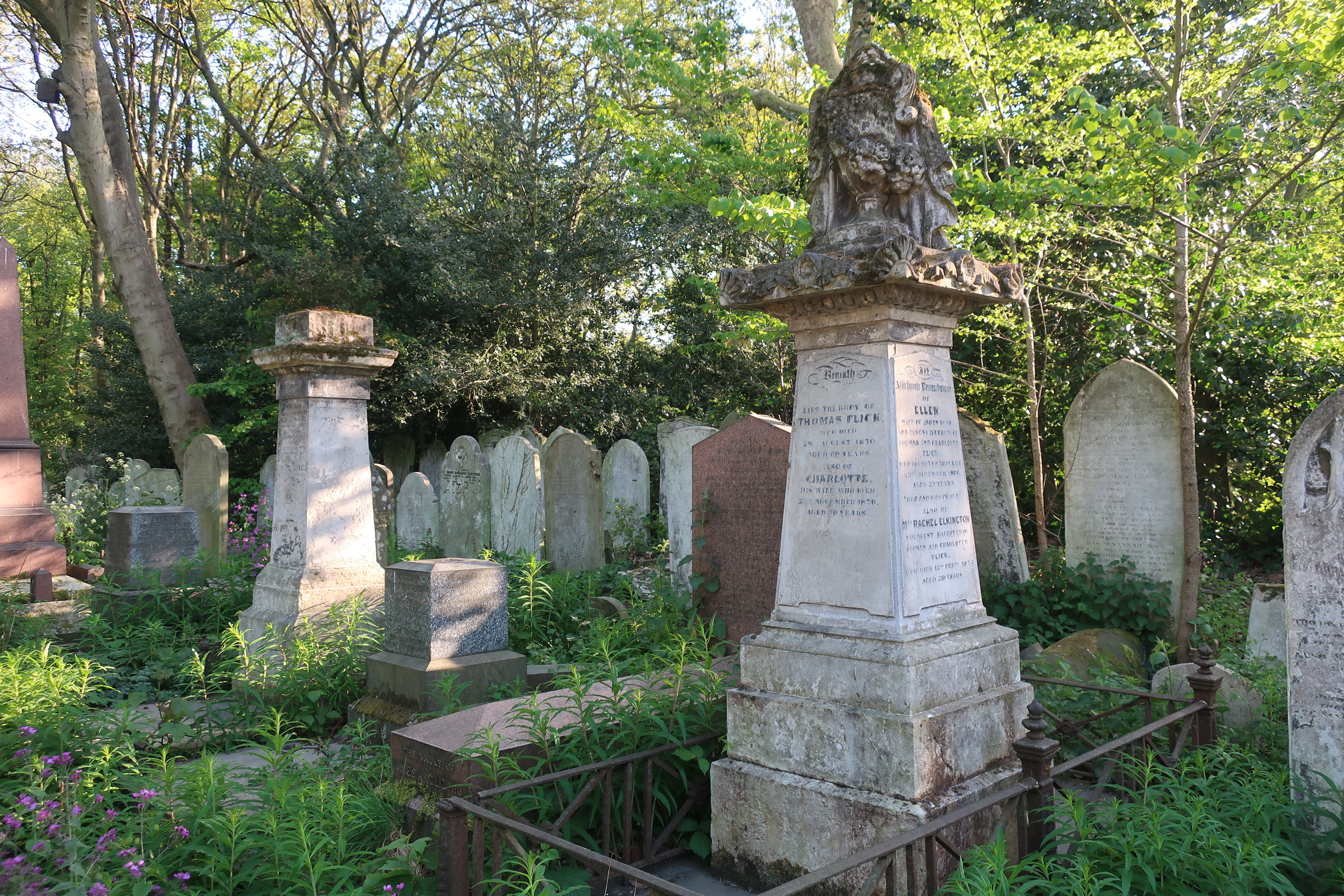
- Cemetery monuments in the park
- Interactive map of Tower Hamlets Cemetery Park
- Type: Nature reserve
- Location: Southern Grove, London, E3 4PX
- Coordinates: 51°31′24″N 0°01′36″W
- Area: 33 acres (13 ha)
- Owner: Tower Hamlets London Borough Council
- Operator: Friends of Tower Hamlets Cemetery Park
- Status: Open year-round
- Public transit: Bow Road; Mile End; Bow Church
- Website: Official website

Cemetery details
- Established: 4 September 1841; 185 years ago
- Abandoned: 1966
- Type: Private, closed to burials
- Style: Garden cemetery
- No. of interments: 350,000

Listed Building – Grade II
- Official name: Boundary Wall, Gates and Gate Piers to Tower Hamlets Cemetery
- Designated: 27 September 1973
- Reference no.: 1065056

Listed Building – Grade II
- Official name: Boundary Wall to Tower Hamlets Cemetery
- Designated: 27 September 1973
- Reference no.: 1065816

Tower Hamlets Cemetery Park is a public park, historic deconsecrated cemetery and local nature reserve in the London Borough of Tower Hamlets within the East End of London. It is one of the "Magnificent Seven" London cemeteries of the Victorian era, built because parish churchyards had become overcrowded. The cemetery opened in 1841 and was formally named the City of London and Tower Hamlets Cemetery, although it was commonly known as Bow Cemetery. It closed in 1966 after 350,000 burials. Purchased by the Greater London Council, with the intention of clearing it for a public park, it passed to Tower Hamlets Council in 1986. The Friends of Tower Hamlets Cemetery Park were formed in 1990 to protect its landscape, historic monuments and biodiversity for the benefit of the public. They registered as a charity in 2004 and manage the park on behalf of the council. Tower Hamlets Cemetery Park encompasses the original cemetery, bounded by historic walls, and additional land including the Scrapyard Meadow and the Ackroyd Drive Greenlink. It contains nine Grade II listed monuments and features. The Soanes Centre is located in the park.

== Geography ==
The park covers 33 acres (13 ha) in the London Borough of Tower Hamlets. The historic parish boundary between Mile End Old Town and Bromley-by-Bow runs north–south through the park, with Mile End to the west and Bromley-by-Bow (the greater part) to the east. (Note: The parish boundary was between St Dunstan Stepney and St Leonard Bromley when the cemetery was built. The Stepney part broke off as Mile End Old Town in 1866. Between 1900 and 1965 the boundary was between the metropolitan boroughs of Stepney and Poplar.) Both parishes were in the historic Tower Hamlets division and the Tower Hamlets parliamentary borough. It has been commonly known throughout its history as Bow Cemetery. The park is bounded by Hamlets Way footpath to the north and Southern Grove to the west. The main gate is on Southern Grove. To the south the boundary follows the railway viaduct of the London, Tilbury and Southend line. The nearest London Underground stations are Mile End and Bow Road, and the nearest DLR station is Bow Church. The Ackroyd Drive Greenlink is located to the southwest of the main site.

== History ==
City of London and Tower Hamlets Cemetery Act 1841
- Act of Parliament
- Parliament of the United Kingdom
- Long title: An Act to establish a general Cemetery for the Interment of the Dead in the Parishes of Saint Dunstan Stepney and Saint Leonard Bromley in the County of Middlesex.
- Citation: 4 & 5 Vict. c. lxiii

Dates
- Royal assent: 21 June 1841

Text of statute as originally enacted

=== Operation as a cemetery ===
In the early 19th century, the population of London grew significantly which increased demand on the small church graveyards until they became overcrowded. The threat of disease from corpses motivated the development of new cemeteries outside the built-up area of London. Seven large privately owned cemeteries—the Magnificent Seven—were built all around the edge of the metropolitan area. Kensal Green was the first, opened in 1833, and Tower Hamlets the last in 1841.

The City of London and Tower Hamlets Cemetery Company bought 27 acres (11 ha) of land in the parishes of Bromley St Leonard and Stepney St Dunstan. Directors of the company included corn merchant Charles Francis and ship owner John Pirie who was Lord Mayor of London. The cemetery was formally consecrated by the Bishop of London, Charles James Blomfield, on Saturday 4 September 1841. The cemetery was consecrated in the afternoon and the first burial took place shortly afterwards. The cemetery was divided into consecrated and unconsecrated parts. It was popular with 270,000 interments by 1889, however most were in common graves. Common interments cost from £0.50 (equivalent to £49 in 2025) whereas family graves cost from £2.10 (equivalent to £205 in 2025). The two chapels, designed by Thomas Henry Wyatt and David Brandon, were completed in 1849. The Anglican chapel was to the west and the Nonconformist chapel was near the eastern boundary.

In 1882 the Bow Cemetery Grievance Committee was formed due to the poor treatment of buried bodies and gravestones. The Home Office completed an inspection of irregularities at the cemetery in 1883. In 1885, the MP for Tower Hamlets, Charles Ritchie, said the practice of overfilling graves had been ended by two orders in council. By 1890 the Mile End Vestry was concerned the cemetery was full and should be closed to burials, but it remained open. The cemetery was damaged by fires in 1919, 1921, 1923, 1933 and 1938, with sparks from passing steam locomotives on the adjacent railway viaduct a potential cause. During the Second World War the cemetery was bombed five times and both cemetery chapels were damaged. Shrapnel damage can be seen on the graves by the Soanes Centre in the northwest corner of the park. Burials, totalling 350,000, continued taking place until 1966.

=== Conversion to a park ===
There was a suggestion that the cemetery should be closed and converted to a park in a letter to The Times in 1903. In November 1959, Stepney and Poplar councils requested that the Minister of Housing and Local Government appoint a person to inspect the condition of the cemetery which had concerned them for many years. In May 1961, Stepney Council agreed to work with Poplar Council and the London County Council to gain the powers necessary to convert part of the cemetery into a public open space. In April 1965, the London County Council was replaced by the Greater London Council (GLC) and the Poplar and Stepney councils were replaced by Tower Hamlets London Borough Council. At a meeting of the GLC in October 1965, the council resolved to promote legislation to purchase the cemetery. Legislation was enacted in August 1966 and by December the GLC had bought the land from the City of London and Tower Hamlets Cemetery Company, the land was deconsecrated and the company was wound up. (Note: Using powers granted by the Greater London Council (General Powers) Act 1966.)

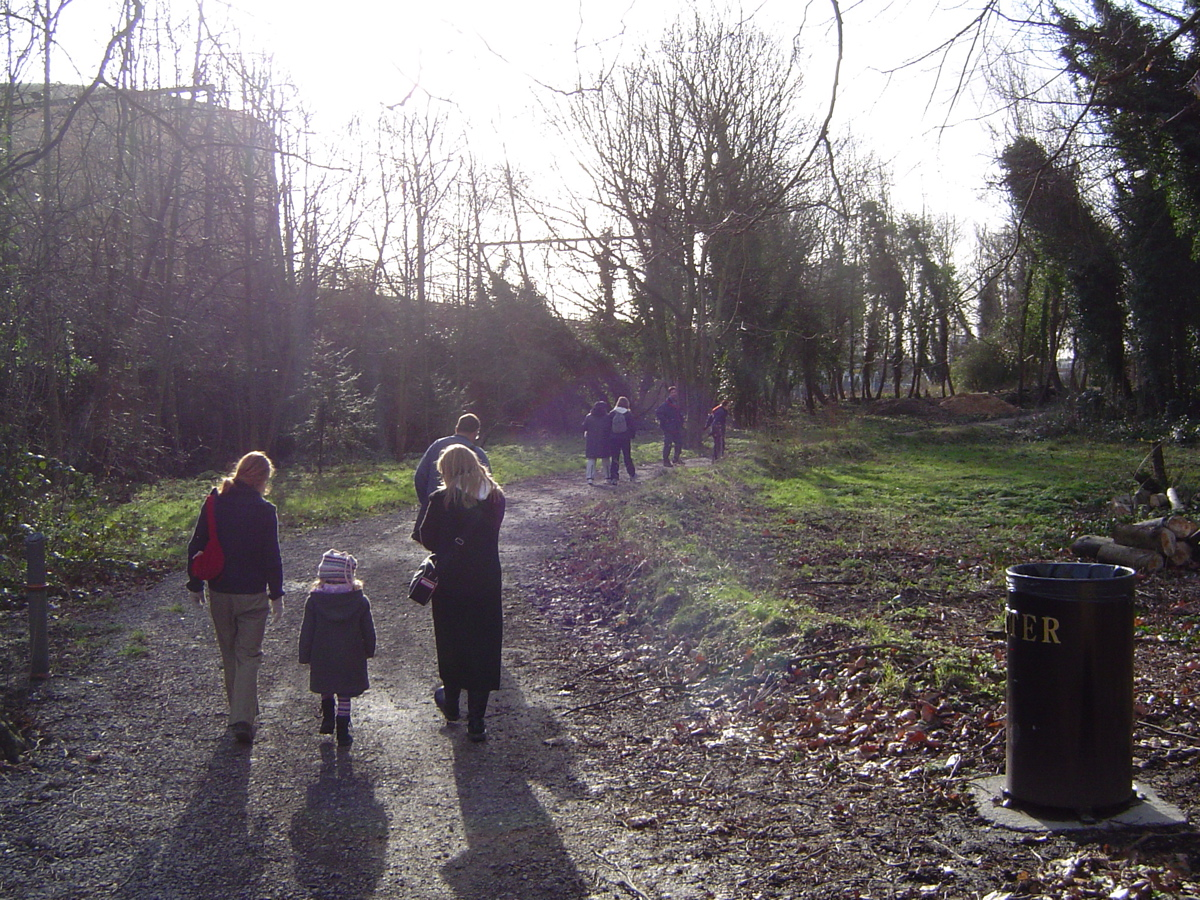
Walking in the park

The intention of the GLC purchase was to create a public park. In December 1968 the GLC published a notice of its intention to clear 4.5 acres (1.8 ha) and remove tombstones for an open space. In 1972, another notice was published to clear 5 acres (2.0 ha). In 1975 another notice to clear 14 acres (5.7 ha) was published. In 1981, notice for another 27 acres (11 ha) was published. Tower Hamlets Council took over the ownership of the park in 1986. In November 1987, the cemetery was designated as a part of a conservation area. Tower Hamlets Council started planting a wider variety of trees and wanted to open up the cemetery woodlands. In 1988, they cleared some of the vegetation using a JCB bulldozer and damaged gravestones. Terry Lyle, of the Tower Hamlets Environment Trust, spoke against the destruction. Peter Griffiths, speaking for the council, said they had only done it that way due to lack of funds, but would not try to clear the site that way again. The Friends of Tower Hamlets Cemetery Park were established in 1990. They were registered as a charity on 6 December 2004. In 1990 it was designated as a metropolitan site of importance for nature conservation. In 2001, the park and Ackroyd Drive Greenlink were recognised as the first local nature reserve in Tower Hamlets.

== Management ==
Tower Hamlets Cemetery Park is owned by Tower Hamlets Council. It is leased at peppercorn rent to the Friends of Tower Hamlets Cemetery Park (FoTHPC), a registered charitable company, who manage the site. The objects of the charity are to preserve and protect the Tower Hamlets Cemetery Park and Ackroyd Drive Greenlink landscape, historic monuments and biodiversity for the benefit of the public. (Note: The full objects are "To preserve, protect, and maintain the landscape of the Tower Hamlets Cemetery Park and Ackroyd Drive Greenlink local nature reserve including its monuments and biodiversity as a place of historic importance and nature reserve for the benefit of the public. To advance the education of the public in particular people living, working or studying in Tower Hamlets through projects and activities provide by the charity, and by partnering organisations whose aims are complementary to the objects of the charity.") The charity manages the park under a three-year service-level agreement with Tower Hamlets Council and receive a grant of £31,900 a year. (Note: Current three-year period runs 1 April 2024 to 31 March 2027.) For urban planning purposes, the site is designated as metropolitan open land, a local nature reserve, a metropolitan site of importance for nature conservation, a tier 2 archaeological priority area and a conservation area with adjacent streets.

== Features ==
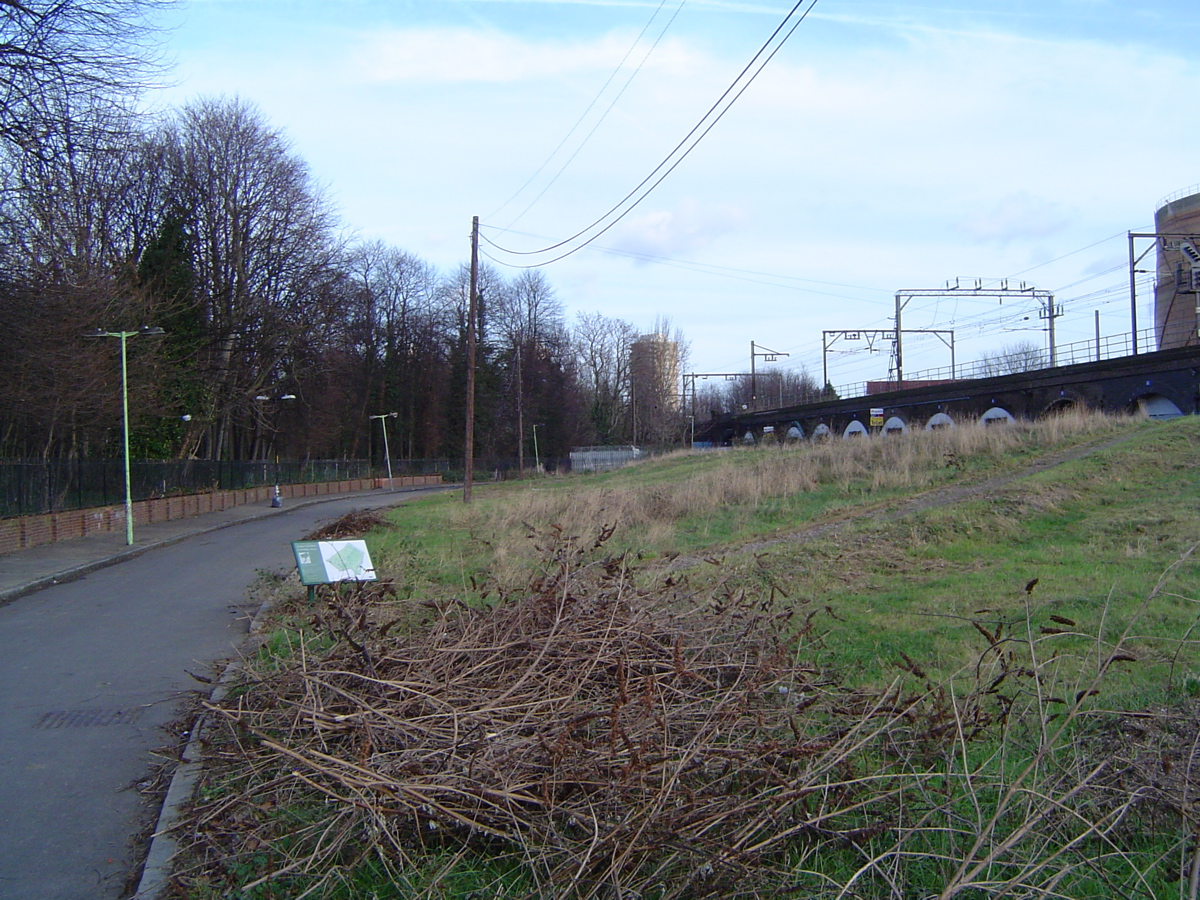
Scrapyard Meadow in 2005 with Cantrell Road still visible

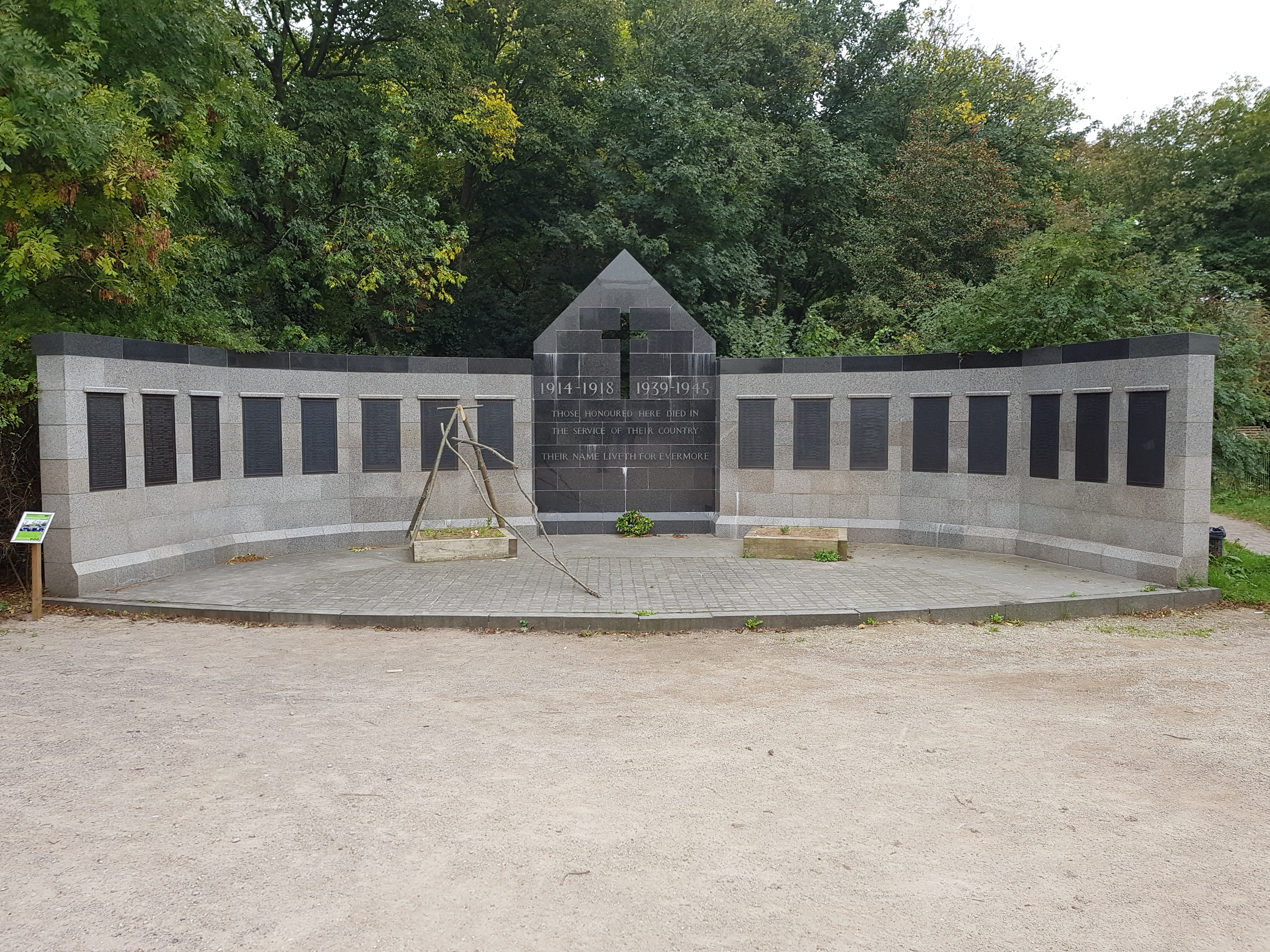
The services war memorial

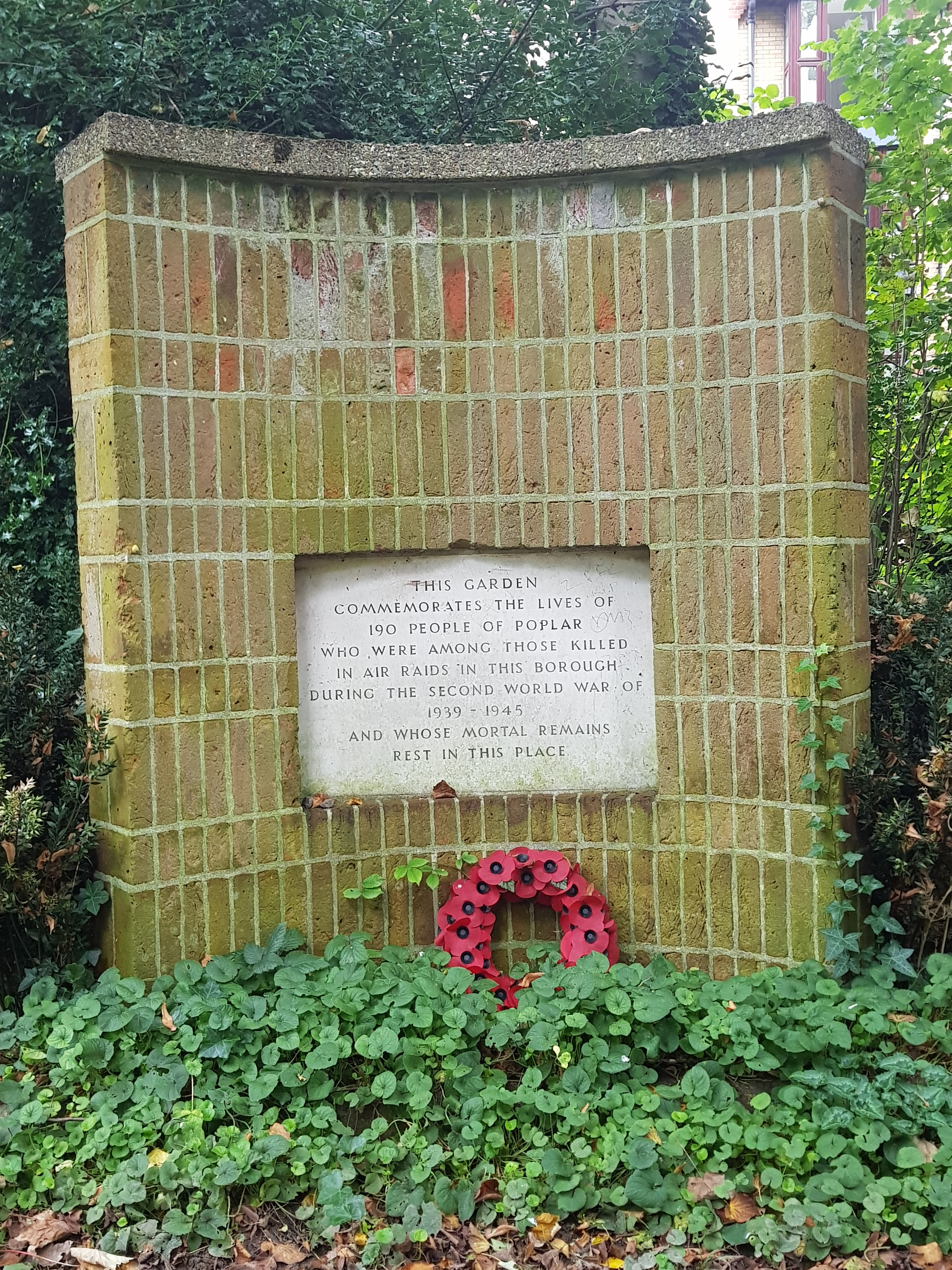
Poplar civilian war memorial

Two sections of the high brick walls which surround the cemetery are Grade II listed on the Historic England national register of listed buildings. Seven individual monuments are Grade II listed. There are two buildings within the park, both towards the northwest corner of the site. The Cemetery Park Lodge is red-brick lodge building. The Soanes Centre, a prefabricated building on the site of the original lodge, was opened in 1993 as an education and ecology studies centre. Though filled with gravestones and funerary monuments, the cemetery has been allowed to revert to resemble a natural woodland, with many wildflowers, birds, and insect species found in the park. There are several trails and walks created by the Friends of Tower Hamlets Cemetery Park. The site has retained a Green Flag Community Award from 2012 to 2026. The park is open 24 hours per day, although the Main Gate on Southern Grove is locked at dusk. Pedestrian, bike and wheelchair accessible gates on Hamlets Way and Cantrell Road remain open at all times.

=== Listed burial monuments ===
Burial monuments listed by Historic England:

- Tomb of Sarah Morris (unknown date) and George Morris (died 1843)
- Tomb of Samuel Weddell (died 1845) (Note: Monument includes inscription noting that Weddell had left £100 (equivalent to £10,500 in 2025) "to the company called the City of London and Tower Hamlets Cemetery", to be invested and used for perpetual upkeep of the monument.)
- Tomb of John Smith (died 1846)
- Tomb (of unknown individual, died c. 1850) to east of Tomb of John Smith
- Tomb of Ellen Llewellyn (died 1854),
- Tomb of Ellen Wiskin (died 1866)
- Tomb of Joseph Westwood (died 1883), noted as the "most imposing monument" of the cemetery and on the Heritage at Risk Register. (Note: The burial site includes his son, Joseph Westwood Jr, both of whom were involved in shipbuilding and engineering)

=== Notable burials ===
Those who are buried or have memorials here:

- Zilpha Elaw (died 1873), African-American preacher and spiritual autobiographer
- John Buckley VC (died 1876), soldier and one of the first recipients of the Victoria Cross (Note: For his bravery in the Indian Rebellion of 1857; living in relative "poverty and obscurity" at the time of his death, he was laid to rest in an unmarked grave, located in 2012 through research by a FoTHCP and marked with a headstone in a 2014 ceremony.)
- Tom McCarthy (died 1899), trade unionist
- Robert McLachlan (died 1904), early entomologist
- Alec Hurley (died 1913), music hall singer
- Will Crooks (died 1921), trade unionist and Labour MP
- Charlie Brown (died 1932), popular publican of Charlie Brown's, Limehouse for 36 years, his funeral attracted 10,000 mourners to the cemetery
- Monument (installed 2016) to children who were in the care of the Barnardo's charity and were buried between 1876 and 1924 in unmarked graves

=== War graves ===
The war memorial on the western side records the 282 Commonwealth war casualties of both world wars buried in the cemetery. The names are listed on bronze panels on a screen wall. Also named are four Dutch merchant seamen. Nine British merchant seamen are buried here who were killed when their ship, SS Bennevis, was hit by a high explosive bomb on 7 September 1940, while berthed in the West India Docks, during an air raid in World War II. The Poplar civilian war memorial is dedicated to the 192 people who were killed during World War II in Poplar and were buried in the cemetery by the council. The two war memorials were locally listed in 2014 to coincide with the First World War centenary.
