= Ossulstone =

Hundred of Middlesex

Coordinates: 51°30′46″N 0°9′44″W

- Area
  - 1831: 47,950 acres (194.0 km^{2})
- Population
  - 1831: 1,008,441
  - 1881: 2,205,806
- History
  - Created: in antiquity
- Status: hundred
- Subdivisions
  - Type: Divisions / liberties

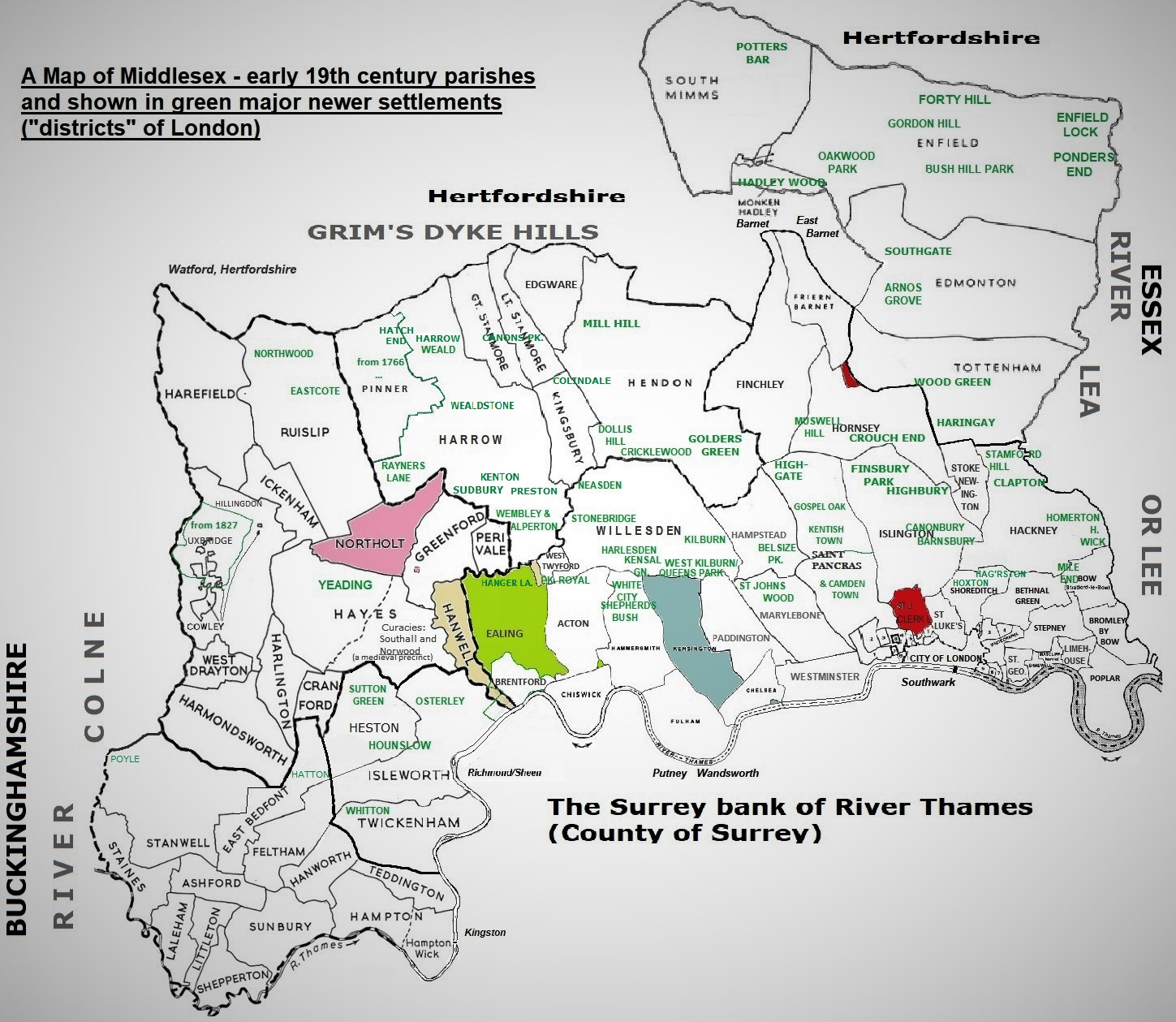
Ossulstone is the large area from Finchley and Friern Barnet southwards. The map shows the substantial parishes (black) and many of the major newer settlements (green).

Ossulstone is an obsolete subdivision (hundred) covering 26.4% of – and the most metropolitan part – of the historic county of Middlesex, England. It surrounded but did not include the City of London and the area has been entirely absorbed by the growth of London. It now corresponds to the seven London Boroughs of Inner London north of the Thames and, from Outer London, in decreasing order, certain historic parishes of the London boroughs of Ealing, Brent, Barnet, and Haringey.

== Toponomy ==
Ossulstone was named after "Oswald's Stone" or "Oswulf's Stone", an unmarked minor pre-Roman monolith which stood at Tyburn, London (the modern-day junction of the Edgware Road with Bayswater Road). Oswald's Stone was earthed over in 1819, but dug up 3 years later in 1822 because of its presumed historical significance. Later in the 19th century it was to be found leaning against the Marble Arch. In 1869, shortly after an archaeological journal published an article about the stone, it disappeared and it has not been found since.

== History ==
The Hundred of Ossulstone is mentioned in the Domesday Book, published in 1086.

Originally meeting at Oswald's Stone, the hundred court eventually moved south-east to the vicinity of Holborn, where by the 19th century it was being held in a building in the north east corner of Red Lion Square, by that stage an outpost of the legal quarter of London close to Lincoln's Inn. Following the de facto end of hundreds as a judicial unit in the late 19th century, the building became the headquarters of Conway Hall Ethical Society.

It was always the largest of the six hundreds of Middlesex, and from early medieval times it had more than 20 parishes and some of the most complicated ecclesiastical units and liberties in the country, as there were many medieval foundations outside of London's walls.

Parishes

Taking New Brentford as part of Brentford (Note: Many historical works consider Brentford together. That is all the Brentford chapels (later created parishes) later united. New Brentford was already for decades governed by its own vestry before its parish status in the mid 17th century,) Ossulstone had fourteen land-border parishes – one, St Pancras, only as to a far corner in Highgate.

Borders clockwise

Ealing bordered three parishes of Elthorne to the west. Six parishes (from a little of Ealing to a corner of St Pancras in Highgate) bordered three parishes of Gore hundred to the north-west. Then, proceeding clockwise, an arm of Finchley and the strip parish of Friern Barnet formed a single counter-salient into the small parishes in and around Chipping Barnet in Hertfordshire, these being the only great salient into Middlesex's shape. Hornsey, Stoke Newington and Hackney in the hundred's northeast bounded Tottenham parish in Edmonton hundred (sometimes called a half-hundred). Four parishes starting with Hackney bordered the Becontree hundred of Essex to the east. Finally two of these land-border parishes and many others had the Thames as their southern limit. Beyond the tidal Thames lay the Blackheath Hundred of Kent to the southeast and those of Lambeth, Brixton and Kingston in Surrey. Until Westminster and Putney Bridges were built in the 18th century the bridge to cross the Thames below Kingston was London Bridge. Ossulstone however omitted the City of London in which lay that bridge, as it surrounded the compact city to the west, north and east. Westminster for many purposes formed a "liberty", meaning it enjoyed its own customs as to markets, and freedoms from wider royal precepts and hundred courts.

Battles

The very edges of the Hundred were militarily strategic and included the sites of all three of Middlesex's known, notable battles: (Note: In the case of the last Brentford Battle note that Putney Bridge and Richmond Bridge were not built until the 18th century, the three road bridges between them even later, starting with the first Kew Bridge. Thus Medieval-founded Kingston Bridge was guarded by the Roundheads; equally Brentford's bridge over the River Brent and the gathering of Royalist troops in Berkshire led to the Roundheads barricading the small town. In the 1471 Battle of "Barnet" the high ground of the Great North Road through elevated Barnet town was unusually shrouded in mist which heightened the fighting. Philippa Gregory's semi-fictional The White Queen attributes the mist to Elizabeth Woodville's mother, Jacquetta of Luxembourg who betrayed allegiances to her pro-Lancastrian dead husband. She married her eldest daughter into the House of York, siding with Edward IV.)

- The Battle of Brentford (1016) was a minor victory of Edmund II of England ("Ironside") against the Danes.
- Towards the end of the Wars of the Roses, the Battle of Barnet in 1471, together with the Battle of Tewkesbury in Gloucestershire the next month, restored Edward IV of England to the throne.
- The Battle of Brentford (1642) was a minor pitched battle and royalist victory of commander Prince Rupert. It was less than three weeks after the partial success and larger Battle of Edgehill in Warwickshire. The resultant standoff and retreat to Oxford for the winter was dubbed the Battle of Turnham Green in the next parish of Chiswick in Ossulstone.

== Divisions ==
In the 17th century the hundred was split into five divisions, which had their own hundred courts and so assumed the remnant administrative purposes of the Hundred. The Tower Division (also known as Tower Hamlets) had significant further responsibilities, as by having its own lord-lieutenant it took on military responsibilities normally exercised at county level. The five divisions of Ossulstone were:

Division	Parishes
Kensington	Large parishes: Kensington, Chelsea, (Note: Of the ten parishes in the Kensington Division, Chelsea had a very small riverside enclave of Kensington until its 19th century abolition. Chelsea was slightly more often than the others recorded with the saint of its church, St Luke's Chelsea) Fulham, Hammersmith, Chiswick, Ealing, Acton, Willesden and Brentford; Small parish: West Twyford
Holborn	Large parishes: Marylebone ( (Note: Also known as St Marylebone)), Paddington, St Pancras and Hampstead. Small parishes: St Giles in the Fields, Westminster and St. George's, Bloomsbury, St Andrew, Holborn (also known as Holborn) (Note: Also known as St Andrew-above-the-bars) and St George the Martyr Holborn, Saffron Hill, Hatton Garden, Ely Rents and Ely Place, the Liberty of the Rolls, the Savoy
Finsbury	Large parishes: Islington: St Mary's including Highbury (Note: Also known as St Mary's, Islington); Finchley, Hornsey, Friern Barnet, Stoke Newington; Small parishes:St Lukes (Note: Also known as St Luke's, Islington); Glasshouse Yard; St Sepulchre, (Note: Also known as St Sepulchre-without or outside-the-walls), Clerkenwell, (Note: Also known as St James, Clerkenwell and in early days as the Priory of St James, Clerkenwell), The London Charterhouse
Tower Hamlets	Large parishes: Hackney (including Upper and Lower Clapton, Dalston and Homerton), Shoreditch (including Haggerston and Hoxton), Bethnal Green, Stepney, Bow (also known as Stratford-le-Bow), Mile End Old Town and Mile End New Town, Poplar, and Bromley-by-Bow (less often known as Bromley); Small parishes: Whitechapel, Spitalfields, Norton Folgate, Limehouse, Ratcliff, Shadwell, Wapping including St George in the East, East Smithfield
Westminster	Small parishes of the city of Westminster averaging much larger than those of the City of London: Close of the Collegiate Church of St Peter (Westminster Abbey), St Margaret and St John; Liberty or Liberties: St Anne (also known as Soho), St Clement Danes, St George Hanover Square (also known as Mayfair and Belgravia), St Martin in the Fields (parent of many of these parishes), St James's, St Mary-le-Strand, St Paul Covent Garden

== Notes and references ==
Notes
