= Soanes Centre =

Community centre in east London

- Interactive map of Soanes Centre
- Address: Southern Grove, E3 4PX; London; United Kingdom
- Coordinates: 51.5235°N 0.0304°W

Construction
- Opened: 1993

The Soanes Centre is an education and ecology studies centre in Tower Hamlets Cemetery Park, London, opened in 1993 by David Bellamy. It is owned by the London Borough of Tower Hamlets. The building is fully accessible and has a large classroom for up to 30 people and a smaller training room.

From its opening the Soanes Centre has been used by the charity Friends of Tower Hamlets Cemetery Park to support their care of the 31-acre site as a historic Victorian-era Magnificent Seven cemetery, and as a designated local nature reserve and Metropolitan Site for the Importance of Nature Conservation. It is also used as the registered address of the charity and used in the delivery of their charitable objectives including conservation, heritage and community, although they are headquartered out of the Cemetery Park Lodge next door.

Soanes Centre is the base for the educational charity Setpoint London East. Since 1997, Setpoint London East has provided free workshops for local schools. About 7,500 children from 60 different schools attend approximately 250 science and nature workshops every year at the Soanes Centre, using Tower Hamlets Cemetery Park as a natural environment for hands-on experience.

In 2023, Setpoint London East invited Kin Structures to become co-stewards of the Soanes Centre and establish a 10-year vision and strategy for its use.

In 2025, representatives from the Save Soanes Campaign spoke at a Tower Hamlets Council meeting and requested the Council give Setpoint London East a long-term, secure lease of the building. In response, the Council have said they are working with both the Friends of Tower Hamlets Cemetery Park and Setpoint London East to develop a model for the building's use that will allow all parties to continue to use it.
