= Ackroyd Drive Greenlink =

Local nature reserve in London, England

Coordinates: 51.5192°N 0.0291°W

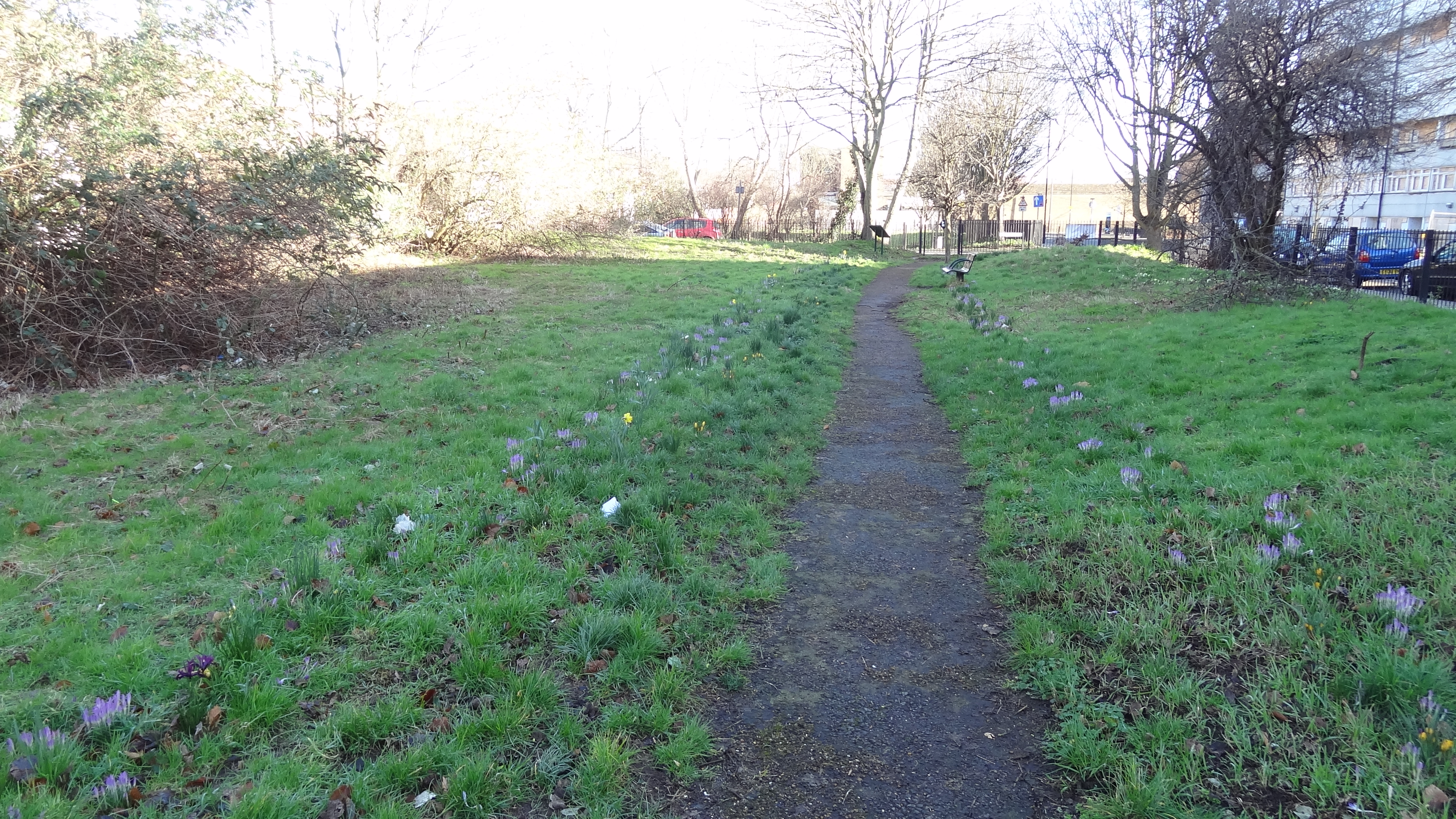
Path through Ackroyd Drive Greenlink

Ackroyd Drive Greenlink is a 0.87 hectare Local Nature Reserve in Bow Common in the London Borough of Tower Hamlets. It forms a green corridor between Tower Hamlets Cemetery Park and Mile End Park.

The Greenlink is a linear site between Ackroyd Drive and a railway viaduct. It is bisected by roads into five rectangular plots. From the south these are Cowslip Meadow, allotments, Blackberry Meadow, Peartree Meadow and Primrose Meadow.
