= Liberty of the Rolls =

Coordinates: 51°30′54″N 0°6′40″W

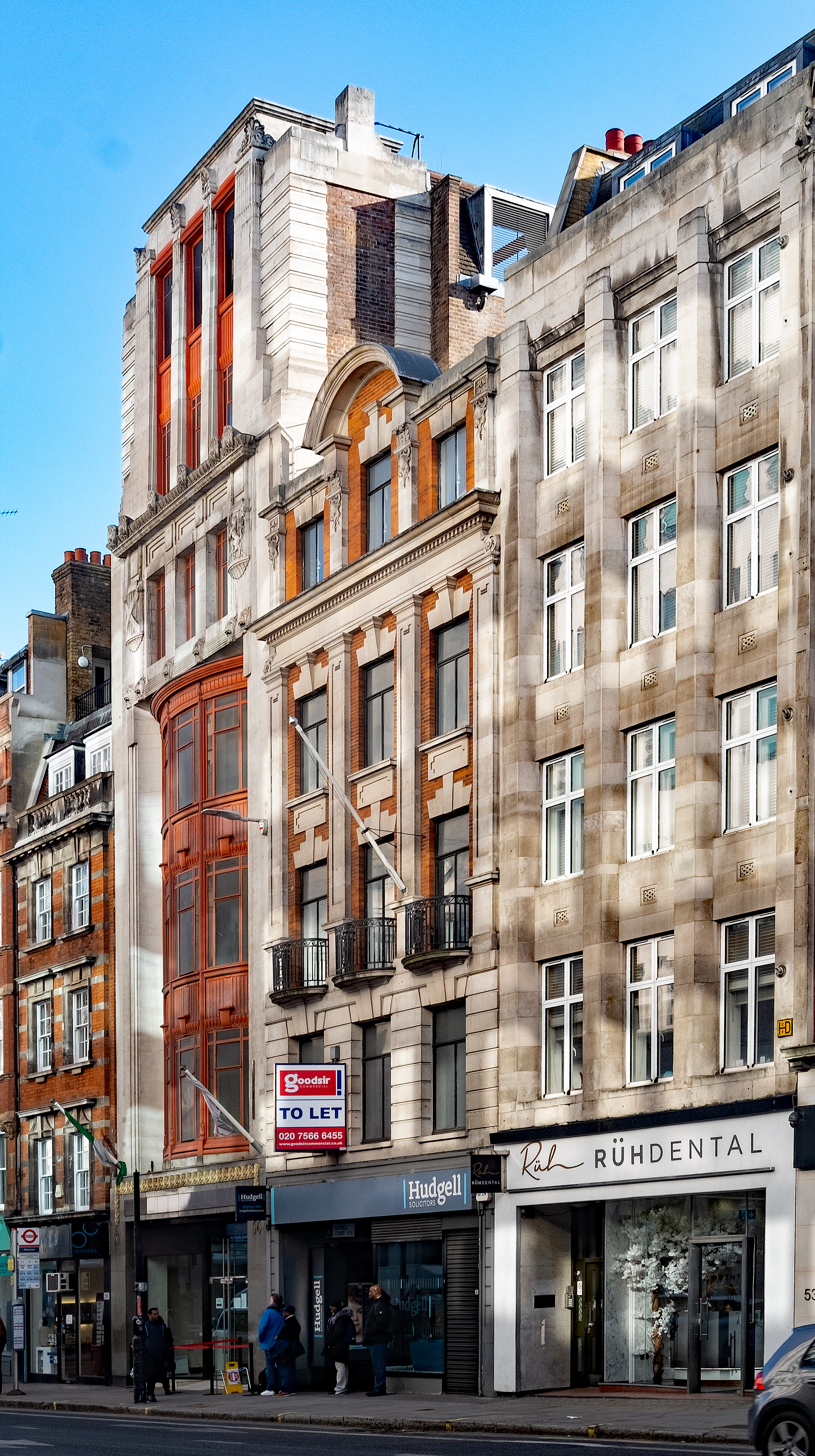

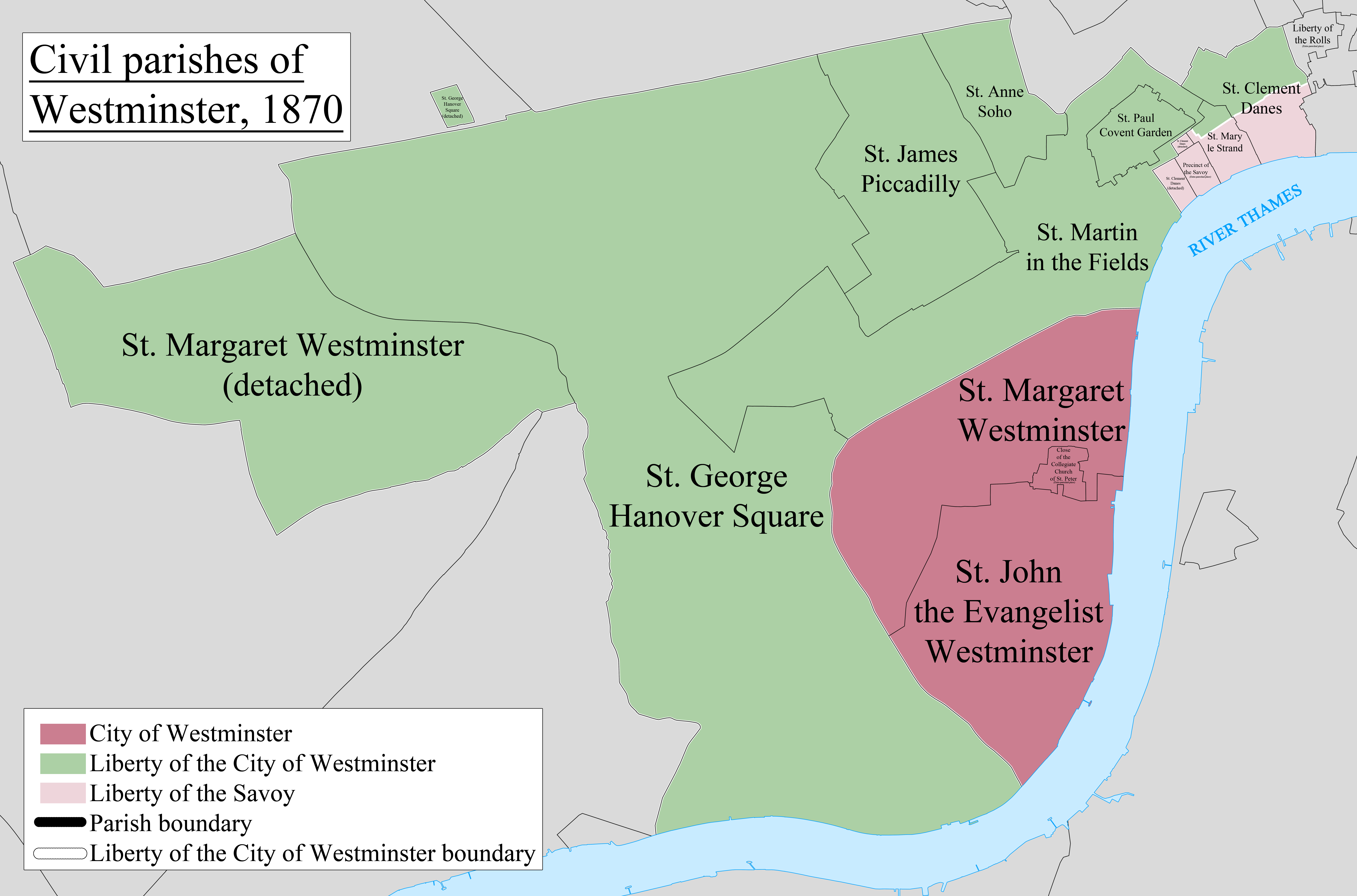
- Area
  - 1881: 12 acres (0.049 km^{2})
  - 1901–1921: 9 acres (0.036 km^{2})
- Population
  - 1881: 546
  - 1901: 252
  - 1921: 93
- Density
  - 1881: 45/acre
  - 1901: 28/acre
  - 1921: 10/acre
- History
  - Abolished: 1922
  - Succeeded by: City of Westminster
- Status: Civil parish
- Government: Master of the Rolls
- Contained within
  - District: Strand (1855–1900)
  - Poor Law Union: Strand (1836–1913); City of Westminster (1913–1922)

The Liberty of the Rolls was a liberty, and civil parish, in the metropolitan area of London, England. At the 1921 census (the last before the abolition of the parish), Liberty of the Rolls had a population of 93.

The Liberty was probably created in the late medieval period by its removal from the Farringdon Without Ward of City of London, and consisted of the part of the ancient parish of St Dunstan-in-the-West that was in the Ossulstone hundred of Middlesex, the rest of the parish was within the City.

It became a separate civil parish in 1866.

Named perhaps after the ancient Rolls House upon Chancery Lane where the rolls of the Court of Chancery of England were kept, or perhaps, like other parishes, the chapel. The site of the house and chapel became the nucleus of the Public Record Office, now the Maughan Library and Provost's Lodgings of King's College London.

It was grouped into the Strand District in 1855 when it came within the area of responsibility of the Metropolitan Board of Works.

It was a civil parish from 1866, which became part of the County of London in 1889 and in 1900 part of the Metropolitan Borough of Westminster. It was abolished as a civil parish on 1 April 1922 to form City of Westminster. However, its boundary could be readily seen as that area of Westminster which was the conjunction between the City of London and the Metropolitan Borough of Holborn (and later the London Borough of Camden). This apparent territorial anomaly disappeared in 1994 when the Local Government Commission for England altered the border to place all of the area east of Chancery Lane into the City.

== See also ==
- Master of the Rolls
