= Mile End New Town =

Coordinates: 51.5200°N 0.0674°W

- Civil parish
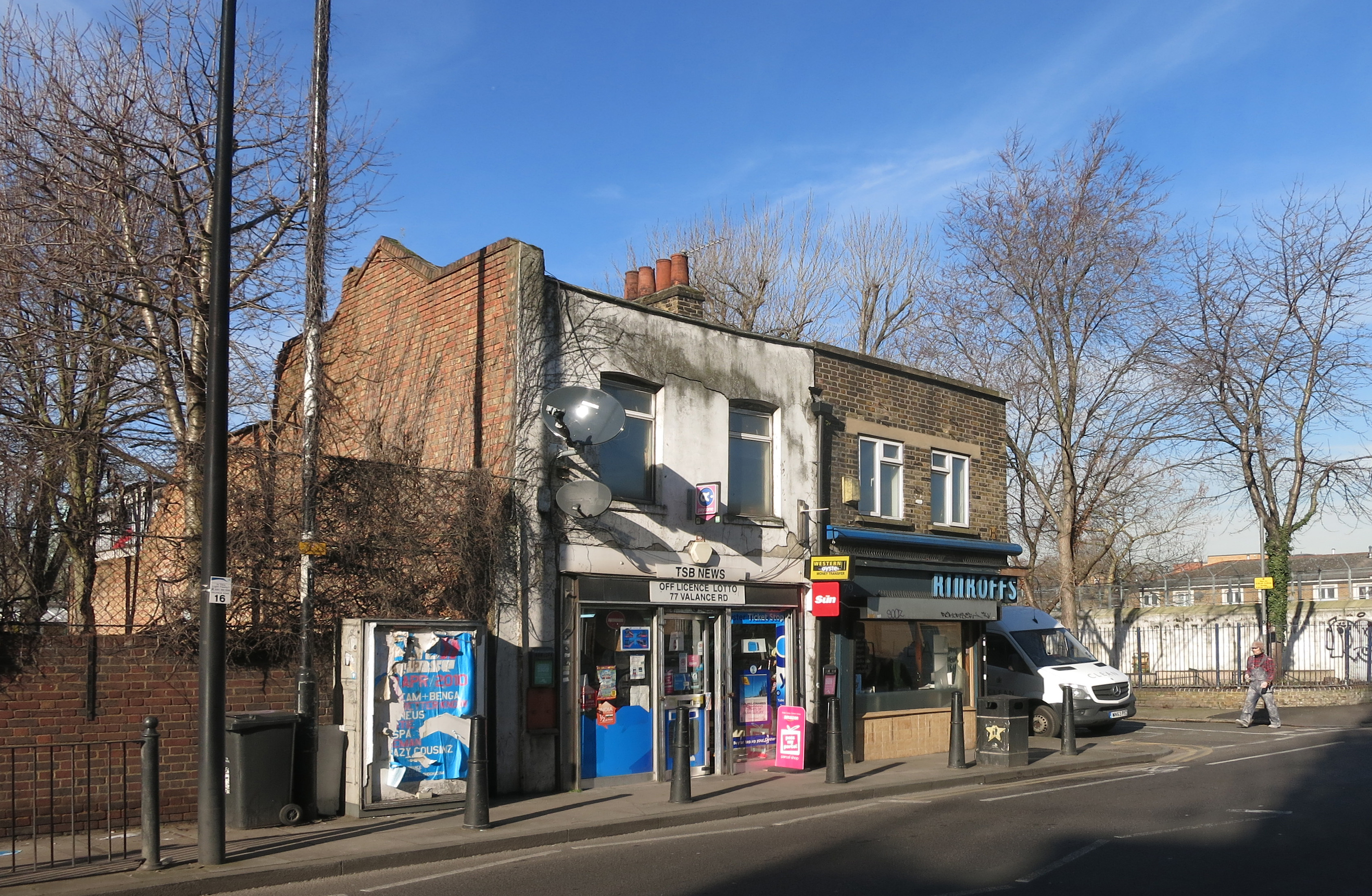

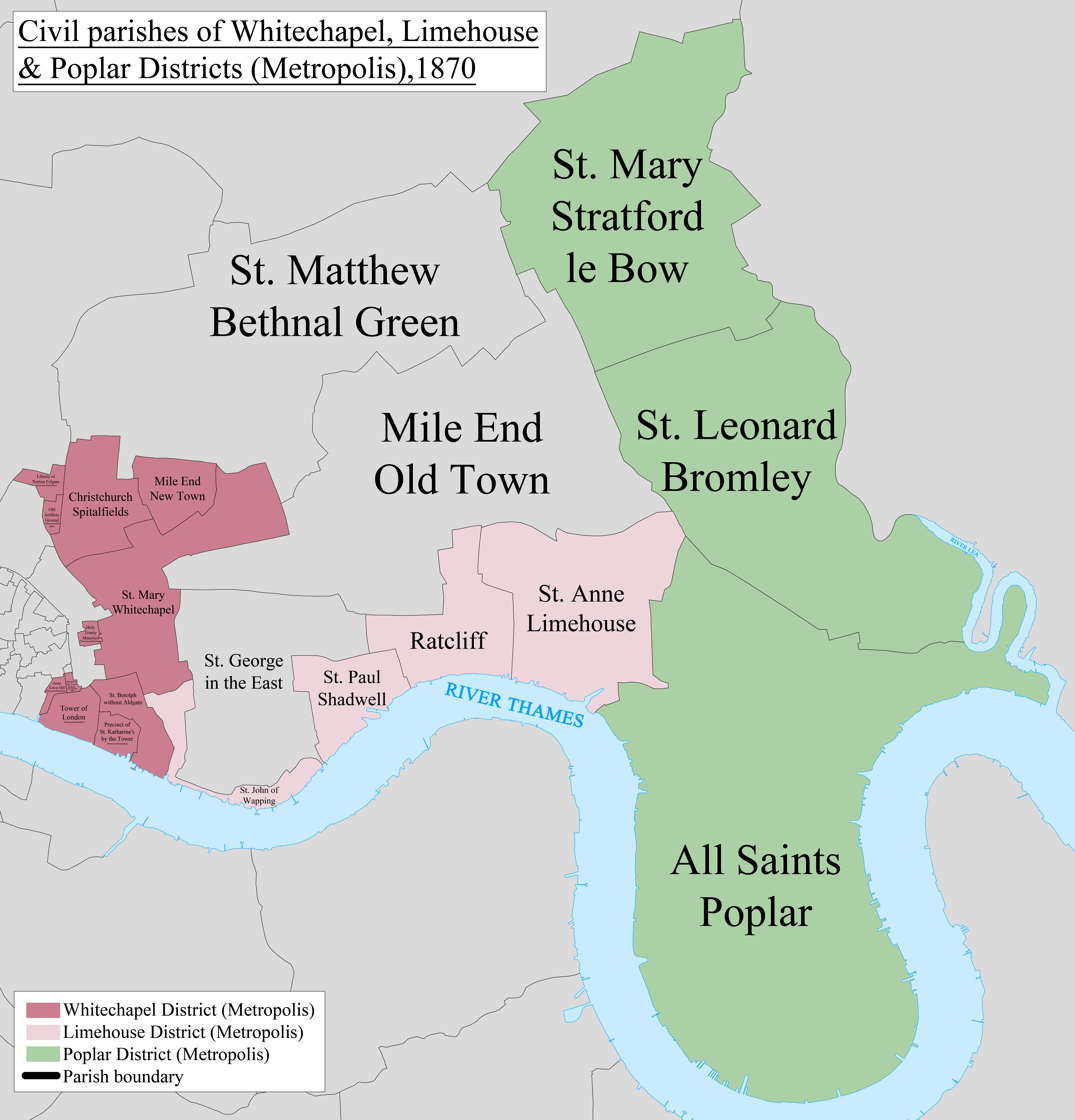
- Area
  - 1911: 43 acres (0.17 km^{2})
- Population
  - 1911: 11341
- History
  - Abolished: 1 April 1921
  - Succeeded by: Whitechapel

Mile End New Town is a former hamlet and then civil parish in the East End of London. Its former area is now part of the London Borough of Tower Hamlets. At the 1911 census (one of the last before the abolition of the parish), Mile End New Town had a population of 11,341.

A map showing the Mile End New Town ward of Stepney Metropolitan Borough as it appeared in 1916.

== History ==
Following a period of rapid growth it became a hamlet within the large ancient parish of Stepney from 1690, and was split off as a separate ecclesiastical parish in 1841 and civil parish in 1866.

It was grouped into the Whitechapel District in 1855 and became part of the Metropolitan Borough of Stepney in 1900. The parish was abolished on 1 April 1921 and merged with Whitechapel.

The area was part of the historic (or ancient) county of Middlesex, but military and most (or all) civil county functions were managed more locally, by the Tower Division (also known as the Tower Hamlets), a historic ‘county within a county’, under the leadership of the Lord-Lieutenant of the Tower Hamlets (the post was always filled by the Constable of the Tower of London). The military loyalty to the Tower meant local men served in the Tower garrison and Tower Hamlets Militia, rather than the Middlesex Militia. This arrangement lasted until 1900.

== Geography ==
It bordered the parish of Bethnal Green to the north, Whitechapel to the east and south, and Spitalfields to the west. Old Montague Street formed much of the southern boundary; the northern and eastern boundary approximating the East London Railway cutting; and the western boundary falling short of Spital Street. The parish of Mile End Old Town was located some distance to the east, separated from Mile End New Town by the parish of Whitechapel.

The parish occupied an area of 43 acres (170,000 m^{2}) and the population was as follows:

Year	1881	1891	1901	1911
Population	10,673	11,303	13,259	11,341
