= Holborn division =

Coordinates: 51.54°N 0.17°W

Holborn
- History
  - Created: 17th century
  - Abolished: 1900
  - Succeeded by: Hampstead MB; Holborn MB; St Marylebone MB; Paddington MB; St Pancras MB
- Status: division of hundred

The Holborn Division was one of four divisions of the Hundred of Ossulstone, in the county of Middlesex, England. The other divisions were named Finsbury, Kensington and Tower.

The area was to the north of the liberty of Westminster, and was included entirely within the County of London on its creation in 1889. It gave its name to the Metropolitan Borough of Holborn created in 1900. The area is now covered by the London Borough of Camden and the northern section of the City of Westminster.

In 1829 the Holborn Division contained the following "parishes, townships, precincts and places":

- The combined parishes of St Giles in the Fields and St George Bloomsbury
- The combined parishes of St Andrew Holborn Above the Bars with St George the Martyr
- The liberty of Saffron Hill, Hatton Garden, Ely Rents and Ely Place
- The liberty of the Rolls
- The parish of St Pancras
- The parish of St John, Hampstead
- The parish of St Marylebone
- The parish of Paddington
- The precinct of the Savoy
