= Finsbury division =

Coordinates: 51.55°N 0.11°W

Finsbury
- Area
  - 1801: 11,492 acres (46.51 km^{2})
- Population
  - 1801: 73,268
  - 1841: 185,174
  - 1881: 482,264
- Density
  - 1801: 6.4/acre
  - 1841: 16/acre
  - 1881: 42/acre
- History
  - Created: 17th century
  - Abolished: 1900
- Status: division of hundred

The Finsbury Division was one of four divisions of the Hundred of Ossulstone, in the historic county of Middlesex, England. The area of the Finsbury Division is now the core of modern north London. The other divisions were named Holborn, Kensington and Tower. Ossulstone hundred was divided in the seventeenth century, with each of the four divisions replacing the hundred for most administrative purposes.

== Area ==
The division stretched from the boundary of the City of London north to the border between Middlesex and Hertfordshire. In 1899, the area was divided, with the southern section becoming part of the new County of London, and the northern section remaining in Middlesex.

The area is now covered by four London Boroughs: Islington, parts of Barnet, Haringey, and Hackney.

== Later use of the name "Finsbury" ==
Under the Reform Act 1832, part of the Division became the Parliamentary Borough of Finsbury. A smaller area became the Metropolitan Borough of Finsbury in 1900. The placename "Finsbury" now generally refers to part of the London Borough of Islington within the former metropolitan borough.

== Constituent parishes ==
The Finsbury Division contained the following "parishes, townships, precincts and places" (listed with current London borough)

Inner Parishes (Included in the district of the Metropolitan Board of Works 1855, County of London 1889)

- The parish of St Luke (Islington)
- The liberty of Glasshouse Yard (Islington)
- The parish of St Sepulchre (Islington)
- The parish of St James, Clerkenwell (Islington)
- The parish of St Mary, Islington (Islington)
- The parish of St Mary, Stoke Newington (Hackney)
- The Charterhouse (Islington)

Outer Parishes

- Finchley (Barnet)
- Friern Barnet (Barnet)
- Hornsey (Haringey)
