= Tower Division =

Historic Liberty of Middlesex, England

Coordinates: 51.52°N 0.04°W

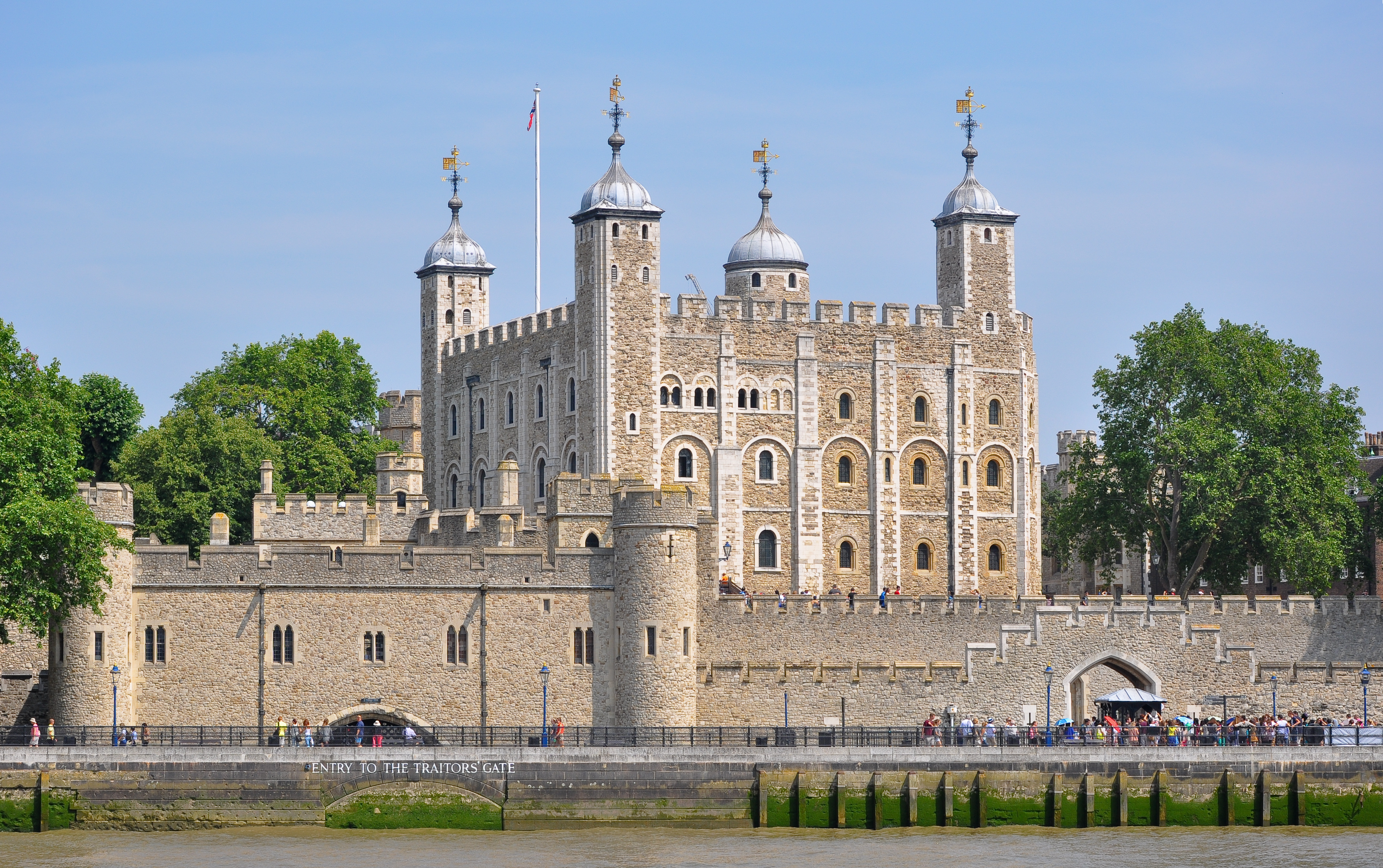
- Area
  - 1801: 9,515 acres (38.51 km^{2})
- Population
  - 1801: 215,382
  - 1841: 513,501
  - 1881: 1,018,337
- Density
  - 1801: 22.6/acre
  - 1841: 54/acre
  - 1881: 107/acre
- History
  - Created: In antiquity
  - Abolished: 1900
  - Succeeded by: Bethnal Green MB; Stepney MB; Poplar MB; Shoreditch MB; Hackney MB
- Status: Liberty , Lord-lieutenancy, division of Hundred

The Tower Division, originally and alternatively known as the Tower Hamlets was a liberty in England, originally formed to provide a garrison for the Tower of London, and which later came to operate as an independent county and hundred.

The Tower Hamlets had its roots in the older Manor of Stepney, and gained responsibility for providing a garrison to the Tower at an early, but unknown, date in the medieval period. The area took its name from these military obligations owed to the Constable of the Tower of London. The term 'Hamlets' probably referred to territorial sub-divisions of Stepney, rather than to the usual meaning of a small village.

Early in the 17th century it began to operate as an independent county with the Constable of the Tower acting as Lord Lieutenant, rather than the Lord Lieutenant of Middlesex, as previously. In this county capacity, the area’s Tower Hamlets Militia gained renown fighting on Parliament’s side during the Wars of the Three Kingdoms.

Later in the 17th century, population growth led to the Ossulstone Hundred being broken up and its responsibilities being transferred to four smaller ‘Divisions’; three of these were new units and the fourth was the pre-existing Tower Hamlets, which acquired its alternative name, the 'Tower Division', at this time.

In contemporary terms, the liberty covered inner East London, the area now administered by the eponymous modern London Borough of Tower Hamlets together with most of the modern London Borough of Hackney (Shoreditch and Hackney proper). The Liberty was seen as synonymous with East London until East London extended further, east of the Lea and into Essex.

== County within a county ==
Small Debts (Tower Hamlets) Act 1779
- Act of Parliament
- Parliament of Great Britain
- Long title: An Act for explaining, amending and rendering more effectual, an Act passed in the Twenty-third Year of the Reign of His late Majesty King George the Second, for the more easy and speedy Recovery of Small Debts within the Tower Hamlets.
- Citation: 19 Geo. 3. c. 68
- Territorial extent: Great Britain

Dates
- Royal assent: 31 May 1779
- Commencement: 31 May 1779 (Note: Section 1.)
- Repealed: 28 August 1846
Other legislation
Amends	Small Debts (Tower Hamlets) Act 1749
Repealed by	County Courts Act 1846

Status: Repealed

Text of statute as originally enacted

The origin of the Tower Hamlets area, later also known as the Tower Division, was as a military district associated with the Tower of London.

The earliest surviving reference to the inhabitants of the Tower Hamlets having a duty to provide a guard for the Tower dates from 1554, during the reign of Mary I. Sir Richard Southwell and Sir Arthur Darcye were ordered by the Privy Council in that year to muster the men of the Hamlets "whiche owe their service to the Towre, and to give commaundement that they may be in aredynes for the defence of the same." As the Hamlets are described as "owing" service there must have been a customary duty long before that date.

Some believe the relationship goes back to the time of William the Conqueror, but others suggest it came later in the medieval period when the Hamlets had a higher population. It is thought that duty had its origin in the rights and obligations of the Manor of Stepney which once covered most or all of the Hamlets area, with the Constable of the Tower also having responsibility for the upkeep of the local part of the Thames and Lea.

After 1605, the Tower Hamlets was a liberty outside the jurisdiction of the Lord Lieutenant of Middlesex, with the Constable of the Tower exercising lieutenancy powers, usually with the ex-officio title of Lord Lieutenant of the Tower Hamlets. This began when the right of the Constable to exact guard duty was extended in 1605 to the raising of a militia, the Tower Hamlets Militia, a force that could be used in the field. Counties were the principal way in which military forces were raised and the creation of the liberty and exemption from county based obligations saw East London made effectively an independent county, and a distinct military unit.

As well as county level military responsibilities, the area also took on civil and judicial responsibilities – normally exercised at county level, making the Tower Hamlets a "county within a county", comparable to the Ridings of Yorkshire.

As in other counties, the area had its own justices of the peace (JPs), appointed by the Constable of the Tower (as lord lieutenant), who administered the county level judicial and civil functions, mainly through their quarter sessions. The usual civic functions of JPs in England included:

- Repair of roads and bridges
- Highway diversions
- Construction and maintenance of county buildings
- Administration of county prisons.
- Supervision of public and private lunatic asylums
- Supervision of petty sessions
- Licensing of public houses
- Supervision of the English Poor Laws (pre-1834)
- Some responsibilities around the militia
- The police
- Setting county rates

There is conflicting evidence around the county-level civil responsibilities exercised by the Tower Hamlets; the extent to which the civil autonomy mirrored the military autonomy, and for how long.

Around 1634, 29 years after the Tower Hamlets gained country responsibilities, it gained a further administrative role. Growth of population around the City of London led to the Ossulstone Hundred being divided into four divisions, with each division taking on the role of the hundred. The pre-existing Tower Hamlets was one of these divisions, taking on the additional name of Tower Division. The other three divisions of the hundred were named Finsbury, Holborn and Kensington.

The Metropolitan Board of Works was established in 1855 in order to lead on the provision of infrastructure in the capital, and this is likely to have led to a reduced responsibilities for the Tower Hamlets JPs. The area's special status ceased in 1889 with the creation of the County of London, and the creation of a Lord Lieutenant for the new county. The Tower division appears to have persisted as a magistracy area well into the 20th century.

== Military function ==
The Tower of London was normally garrisoned by a small force of Yeoman Warders, but these were supplemented by sometimes large numbers of local Hamlets men, known as Hamleteers. The area also provided the Tower Hamlets Militia, which could be deployed in the field in the event of invasion or rebellion.

There was no peacetime standing army in England until the interregnum, and when regular units were formed they were typically raised from wider geographical districts than the Tower Hamlets; however, the area has provided some examples of regular forces.

=== Spanish Armada ===
Tower Hamlets units are recorded as being present at the Tilbury muster in August 1588, when Elizabeth I reviewed the English troops available to face the expected Spanish invasion. It was there that the Queen delivered her famous Tilbury address.

=== Size of garrison contribution ===
The size of the Hamleteer contribution to the Tower's garrison seems to have varied greatly. Records from 1610 show a modest 9 men per night on duty, but in 1641, a tight of great tension, 552 Hamleteers were recorded as guarding the Tower on a nine-night rota. The size of the contribution varied according to which area's men were on duty: on one evening Whitechapel provided 45 men, while on another Hackney, Bow, Bromley-by-Bow and Old Ford together provided 85.

=== English Civil War ===
==== Build-up to war ====
In the lead-up to the war, London and the eastern counties were broadly in sympathy with Parliament and against the King, with the Tower Hamlets being notably ardent in its parliamentary sympathies. This wasn't always a militant radicalism though, as evidenced when the war-weary poor of Stepney, seeking compromise with the King, partially demolished a parliamentarian strongpoint in the Lines of Communication, a ring of parliamentary fortifications around London. Despite this the support for Parliament remained generally robust throughout the coming war.

The strategic importance of the Tower, together with its money and munitions meant Charles I was careful to install a Constable of the Tower, John Byron, who was loyal to him. In late December 1641 and early January 1642 Byron brought in stores of artillery and other armaments, parliament responded by putting a guard, a limited siege, using the City of London Trained Bands (the Tower Hamlets Trained Band garrisoning the Tower were separate from the City of London Trained Bands) under the popular Philip Skippon from 12 January.

Around 20 January, the Constable (with the permission of the King) answered a summons and appeared before a House of Lords committee in Westminster to answer for his build-up of armaments. That night, with the Constable away, Skippon led a force of 500 men of the London Trained Bands under the cover of darkness, to the narrow streets of St Katharines district, by the riverside, just east of the Tower. Skippon and his men approached the Iron Gate, a small now lost feature (its site, on the east bank of the moat, is under the Tower Bridge Approach Road), outside the moat which protected a postern which opened out from the Develin Tower. The Tower was protected by a force of Hamleteers, but Skippon knew the areas political loyalties were with Parliament. Skippon believed he could seize the fortress in a coup de main by persuading the Hamleteers to let his force into the Tower, hold it and thereby transform the strategic and political situation in the capital.

Skippon called on the Sergeant on the Iron Gate to let his men through so that the Tower would fall into Parliament's hands. The Serjeant would not let them in, and the force waited for some time in the hope that he could be talked round. The Sergeant refused a second attempt to persuade him and Skippon's force dispersed when the Constable returned from parliament just before 10pm. It seemed that the historic local bonds proved more powerful than the highly charged political affiliations of the day. Under normal circumstances Skippon would have been put on trial and executed for his actions, but Parliament swiftly exonerated him.

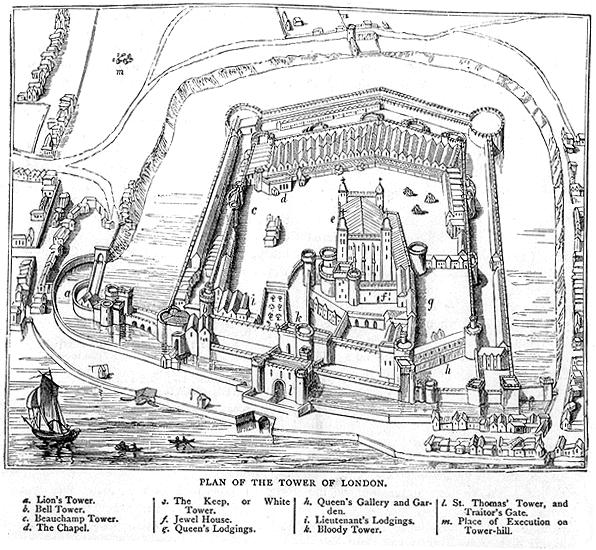
The Iron Gate stood on the outside of the moat, to the south-east of the Tower

Before the outbreak of the first English Civil War, parliament had managed to use political pressure to get the King to install a Constable, Sir John Conyers, sympathetic to their cause. Knowing his position in London was weak, the King fled the capital before war broke out in the summer. The Tower proved an extremely valuable asset to Parliament throughout the war.

==== Hostilities ====
In the early years of the English Civil War both Parliament and the King relied on local Militias such as that of the Tower Hamlets. Generally speaking these forces were county based and very reluctant to leave their home areas. A notable few organised "Trained Bands" of more highly motivated and reliable men willing to spend more time training – Tower Hamlets had a large Trained Band ready to serve outside the Liberty and this would later be organised into two regiments.

By early 1643, the Tower Hamlets forces, together with those of Westminster and Southwark joined those of the City under the command of Sir Philip Skippon, who had previously tried to get the Tower Hamlets troops to betray the Tower to him before the start of the war. By 1644 The regiment of the Tower Hamlets is estimated to have 2-3000 men, while the strength of the reserve Yellow regiment of the Auxiliaries of the Tower Hamlets is not known.

Under Skippon's leadership, the Tower Hamlets Trained Bands saw action at Basing House (1643), Cropredy Bridge (1644), Newbridge (1644) and on their own territory, when the Yellow regiment fought at Bow Bridge in 1648.

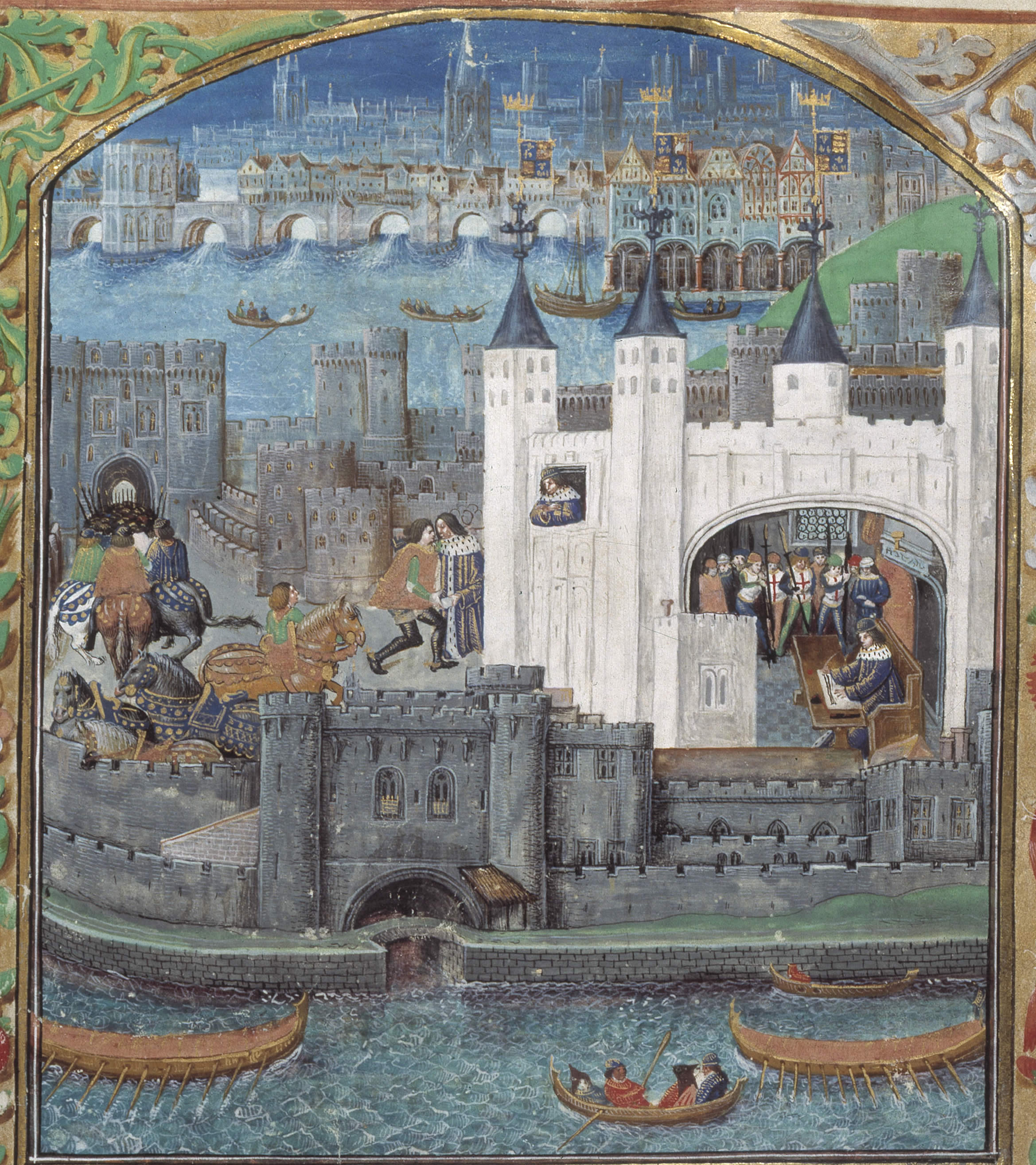
The once whitewashed White Tower in the 15th century. The Tower was a striking landmark for many miles to the east. The Traitors Gate was also once whitewashed.

Regimental Flag designs varied but some versions featured the Tower of London's White Tower with the Traitors' Gate watergate in the foreground. The troops wore buff sleeveless jackets to mark them out as a Trained Band, soldiers with higher status and value than ordinary Militia.

=== Fusiliers ===
In 1685, during the Monmouth Rebellion, King James II raised a force of infantry from the Tower of London garrison; the Tower Hamlets Militia. The Regiment was formed of two companies of Militia and one of miners and was known as the Ordnance Regiment and was soon renamed the Royal Fusiliers, after the fusil, the type of musket they were equipped with. The Tower Hamlets Militia helped form the Fusiliers and subsequent Tower Hamlets reserve units would come under the organisational wing of the regiment.

The regiment later became known as the 7th Regiment of Foot (Royal Fusiliers) and The Royal Fusiliers (City of London Regiment) before merging with other Fusilier regiments to form the Royal Regiment of Fusiliers in 1968. The modern regiment is headquartered at the Tower of London, where laid up Colours of the regiment are kept. The Fusiliers also maintain a museum at the Tower.

=== Police role ===
In the days before the country had a police force, the authorities had great difficulty in controlling riots, so would call on the local county militias in need. One example came in the Tower Hamlets in 1736. There had been a period of high migration from Ireland, with the newcomers initially working in the agricultural sector in rural parts of Stepney. Later they would switch to urban occupations, accepting lower wages as weavers or coal heavers than the established community, who experienced hardship as a result.

This economic grievance, aggravated by Anti-jacobite feeling led around 3,000 people to riot in Spitalfields, Shoreditch and Whitechapel. Unrest continued for three days with property and pubs associated with the Irish population ransacked. The Riot Act was read several times without affect and the riot only ended after the Tower Hamlets Militia were sent. Shots were fired in Brick Lane and one rioter was killed.

=== Militia and Volunteers ===
Militia (Tower Hamlets) Act 1796 (Note: The citation of this act by this short title was authorised by section 1 of, and the first schedule to, the Short Titles Act 1896. Due to the repeal of those provisions it is now authorised by section 19(2) of the Interpretation Act 1978.)
- Act of Parliament
- Parliament of Great Britain
- Long title: An act for the better raising and ordering the militia forces of the Tower Hamlets, in the county of Middlesex.
- Citation: 37 Geo. 3. c. 25
- Territorial extent: Great Britain

Dates
- Royal assent: 30 December 1796
- Commencement: 30 December 1796 (Note: The Acts of Parliament (Commencement) Act 1793.)
- Repealed: 1 October 1921
Other legislation
Amends	City of London Militia Act 1662
Amended by	Militia (Voluntary Enlistment) Act 1875; Statute Law Revision Act 1872; Militia Act 1882
Repealed by	Territorial Army and Militia Act 1921
Relates to	Militia Act 1786; Tower Hamlets Militia Act 1797

Status: Repealed

Text of statute as originally enacted

Tower Hamlets Militia Act 1797
- Act of Parliament
- Parliament of Great Britain
- Long title: An act to enable his Majesty to draw out and embody the militia forces of the Tower Hamlets, in the county of Middlesex.
- Citation: 37 Geo. 3. c. 75
- Territorial extent: Great Britain

Dates
- Royal assent: 6 June 1797
- Commencement: 6 June 1797
- Repealed: 21 August 1871
Other legislation
Repealed by	Statute Law Revision Act 1871
Relates to	Militia (Tower Hamlets) Act 1796; Militia (Tower Hamlets) Act 1813

Status: Repealed

Text of statute as originally enacted

Militia of Tower Hamlets Act 1808
- Act of Parliament
- Parliament of the United Kingdom
- Long title: An Act to indemnify all Officers and Persons who have carried into Execution any of the Provisions of an Act passed in the last Session of Parliament, for completing and increasing the Militia of Great Britain, in relation to the Militia of the Tower Hamlets.
- Citation: 48 Geo. 3. c. 136
- Territorial extent: United Kingdom

Dates
- Royal assent: 30 June 1808
- Commencement: 30 June 1808
- Repealed: 10 August 1872
Other legislation
Repealed by	Statute Law Revision Act 1872 (No. 2)
Relates to	Militia (Great Britain) (No. 2) Act 1807

Status: Repealed

Text of statute as originally enacted

Militia (Tower Hamlets) Act 1813
- Act of Parliament
- Parliament of the United Kingdom
- Long title: An Act to extend the Services of the Militia of the Tower Hamlets to all Parts of the United Kingdom.
- Citation: 53 Geo. 3. c. 132
- Territorial extent: United Kingdom

Dates
- Royal assent: 12 July 1813
- Commencement: 12 July 1813
- Repealed: 1 January 1883
Other legislation
Amends	Militia (No. 2) Act 1811
Amended by	Statute Law Revision Act 1873
Repealed by	Militia Act 1882
Relates to	Tower Hamlets Militia Act 1797

Status: Repealed

Text of statute as originally enacted

While most UK militia fell into disuse in the early 19th century, the Tower Hamlets Militia endured, becoming known in the late 19th century as the Tower Hamlets Militia (Queen's Own Light Infantry) and using the White Tower as its cap badge.

An invasion scare of 1857 saw the creation of the Volunteer Force which included both Engineer and Rifle Volunteer Corps and which in the case of the Tower Hamlets supplemented the existing militia.

These Volunteer units were raised by members of the community with the permission of their county's Lord Lieutenant, but as Tower Hamlets was effectively a 'county within a county', having its own Lord Lieutenant (the Constable of the Tower), it raised units in its own right (though in the Tower Hamlets, as elsewhere, not all units raised bore the name of their Lord Lieutenancy area).

A significant number of units were raised, a noteworthy example being the East Metropolitan RVC (11th Tower Hamlets) which was entirely made up of Jewish Volunteers. The profusion of units, some very short lived before being amalgamated or discontinued, makes the lineage of Tower Hamlets units sometimes unclear.

The Cardwell Reforms of 1871 saw the volunteer element of the armed forces re-organised and given more supervision and support from central government. The local engineer unit became known at this time as the 2nd Tower Hamlets (East London) Engineer Volunteers.

The infantry units retained their local identity but became reserve forces attached to a regular regiment, The Rifle Brigade (The Prince Consort's Own). The Militia became the 7th Battalion, the 2nd Tower Hamlets Rifle Volunteer Corps became the 9th Battalion and the 1st Tower Hamlets Rifle Volunteer Brigade (THVRB) also joined the regiment but retained its own name. In 1881 these latter two unit became part of the East London Brigade for training and mobilisation purposes but remained part of The Rifle Brigade (The Prince Consort's Own) regiment.

The 1st Tower Hamlets Rifle Volunteer Brigade (THVRB) used the White Tower as its cap badge at this time and used the Tower of London moat for training and drilling. Machine Gun elements of this unit were sent to the 2nd Boer War and earned a battle honour at Colenso.

In 1904 the 1st Tower Hamlets Rifle Volunteer Brigade (THVRB) was transferred from The Rifle Brigade (The Prince Consort's Own) regiment to the Royal Fusiliers a historic regiment originally formed in 1685 primarily from Tower Hamlets men.

=== First World War ===
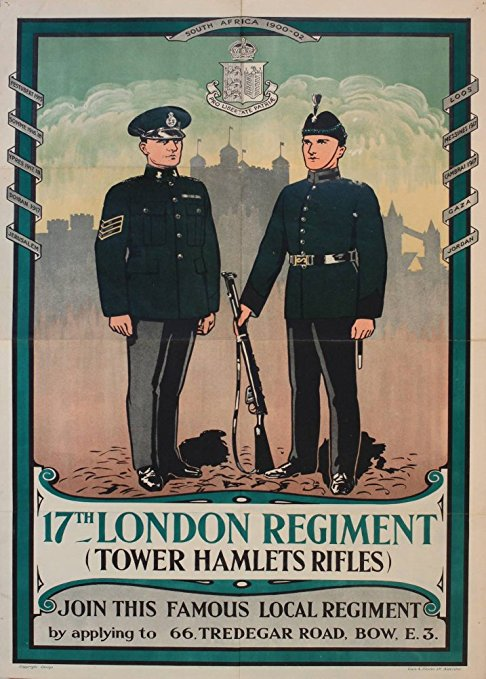
Recruitment poster for the Tower Hamlets Rifles, c.1930

In 1908 London's reserve infantry forces were re-organised to form a new London Regiment, though the Tower Hamlets units retained their local identities and traditions and affinities gained while attached to regular regiments. The 4th Bn Royal Fusiliers (previously the 1st Tower Hamlets Rifle Volunteer Brigade) became the 4th Bn while the 9th Bn The Rifle Brigade (The Prince Consort's Own) (previously the 2nd Tower Hamlets) became the 17th (County of London) Battalion, The London Regiment (Poplar and Stepney Rifles).

Both these units saw extensive combat in the First World War. The army's need for expansion saw the 4th (City of London) Battalion, London Regiment "duplicated" to form four battalions (1/4th, 2/4th, 3/4th and 4/4th); while the Poplar and Stepney Rifles were "duplicated" to form the 1/17th, 2/17th and 3/17th. The Tower Hamlets Engineers, by now a part of the wider Royal Engineers and retaining their local identity but not their name, was also heavily involved in the conflict.

In 1926 the Poplar and Stepney Rifles was renamed the 17th London Regiment (Tower Hamlets Rifles).

=== Second World War ===
In 1937 the London Regiment was abolished and the Tower Hamlets Rifles were transferred back to The Rifle Brigade (The Prince Consort's Own) regiment, seeing action in North Africa and Italy.

The increasing importance of aerial warfare saw the former 4th (City of London) Battalion, London Regiment being transferred to the Royal Artillery (RA) as an Anti-aircraft artillery unit, the 60th (City of London) AA Brigade, RA (TA). The unit retained its Tower Hamlets identity, if not its name, and saw action on the home front and in continental Europe.

Descendant units of the Tower Hamlets Engineers were also extensively involved in the conflict.

=== Cold War ===
After the war the Tower Hamlets units lost their identities through a series of amalgamations.

The longest to bear the local name were the Tower Hamlets Rifles who went through the Second World War as infantry. Both these Tower Hamlets Battalions (9th and 10th) of the Rifle Brigade were amalgamated to form 656th Light Anti-Aircraft Regiment, Royal Artillery (Tower Hamlets) TA in 1947 and from 1961 to 1967 were known as the 300th (Tower Hamlets) Light Air Defence Regiment RA (TA).

In 1967 a further amalgamation saw the loss of local identity in this last Tower Hamlets unit and the last of the Tower Hamlets name in the British Army. Some current British Army units, recruited on a much broader geographical basis, count Tower Hamlets units as part of their historic lineage.

== Extent ==
Various historical sources list different components of the division, but its overall area remained the same. The Metropolitan Police Act 1829 enumerated the "parishes, townships, precincts and places" of the Tower Division for inclusion within the Metropolitan Police District, while the Militia (Tower Hamlets) Act 1796 specified how many men each component should supply to the division's militia.

Components of the Tower division
Type	Name	Militia
parish	St Mary, Whitechapel	132
parish	Christchurch, Spitalfields	78
parish	St Leonard, Shoreditch	155
liberty	Norton Folgate	31
parish	St John, Hackney	84
parish	St Matthew, Bethnal Green	122
hamlet	Mile End Old Town	57
hamlet	Mile End New Town	22
parish	St Mary, Stratford Bow	22
parish	Bromley St Leonard	6
parish (Note: "hamlet of Poplar and Blackwall" in the 1796 act.)	All Saints, Poplar	26
parish	St Anne, Limehouse	26
hamlet	Ratcliff	44
parish	St Paul, Shadwell	71
parish	St John, Wapping	45
parish	St George in the East	110
liberty (Note: "manor or liberty" in the 1796 act.)	East Smithfield	45
precinct	St Catherine	11
liberty	His Majesty's Tower of London consisting of:	(Note: The Tower liberty was not listed separately in the 1796 act.)
precinct	—Tower Within	— (Note: Tower Within was not listed in the 1796 act.)
precinct (Note: "liberty of the Tower Without" in the 1796 act.)	—Old Tower Without	5
liberty (Note: "precinct of the Old Artillery" in the 1796 act.)	—Old Artillery Ground	11
parish	—Minories Holy Trinity	8
precinct	—Wellclose	9

== Namesakes ==
=== Parliamentary borough ===
From 1832 to 1885 there was a parliamentary borough named "Tower Hamlets", after the Tower Division. From 1832 to 1868 it occupied the same boundaries as the Tower Division, with the best known MP for the area being Joseph d'Aguilar Samuda, a well known shipbuilder and an officer in the 2nd Tower Hamlets Rifle Volunteer Corps. After 1868, population growth saw the constituency split in two; the southern part of the area kept the name Tower Hamlets while Hackney, Shoreditch and Bethnal Green became part of a new Hackney constituency. The southern, Tower Hamlets constituency, persisted until 1885.

=== Modern borough of Tower Hamlets ===
The name "Tower Hamlets" was subsequently used for the modern London Borough of Tower Hamlets created in 1965 from southern areas of the Tower Division.

The Shoreditch and Hackney proper areas of the Tower Division together make up most of the area of the modern London Borough of Hackney.
