= Kensington division =

Coordinates: 51.50°N 0.25°W

Kensington
- Status: division of hundred

The Kensington Division was one of four divisions of the Hundred of Ossulstone, in the county of Middlesex, England. The other divisions were named Finsbury, Holborn and Tower. Ossulstone hundred was divided in the seventeenth century, with each of the four divisions replacing the hundred for most administrative purposes.

== Area ==
The division lay to the west and north west of the liberty of Westminster, and in 1889 it was divided, part passing to the new County of London and part remaining in Middlesex.

The area is now covered by four London Boroughs: Hammersmith and Fulham, Kensington and Chelsea, most of Ealing and part of Hounslow.

== Constituent Parishes ==
The Kensington Division contained the following "parishes, townships, precincts and places" in 1829:

- The parish of Kensington
- The parish of St Luke, Chelsea
- The parish of Fulham
- The hamlet of Hammersmith
- The parish of Chiswick
- The parish of Ealing
- The parish of Acton
