= Hendon and District Archaeological Society =

English amateur archaeological society

Hendon and District Archaeological Society (HADAS) is an amateur archaeological society based in the London Borough of Barnet, England, and is registered as a charity with the UK Charity Commission (Registration number 269949).

== History ==
HADAS was founded in 1961 by Themistocles Constantinides to investigate the Saxon origins of Hendon and since has grown to over 150 members covering the whole of the London Borough of Barnet, and addressing all archaeological periods. Its two declared objectives are to undertake archaeological and historical research, and education for the public benefit, with particular reference to the London Borough of Barnet.

== Archaeological activities ==
The society has been active in many excavations and other fieldwork in the Borough of Barnet and surrounding areas, the results of which are published in the Society's Journal and newsletters, or published in books such as A Place in Time – The London Borough of Barnet up to c.1500 (ISBN 0 9503050 6 5). The first excavation in 1961 was at the ruins of Church End Farm, near the parish church of Hendon St Mary's. Further excavations have included the West Heath Mesolithic camp site at Hampstead, Roman Hendon, medieval Chipping Barnet, and the Roman site of Sulloniacis at Brockley Hill, a centre of Roman pottery production.

With the introduction of the UK Government's PPG 16 (Planning Policy Guidance 16: Archaeology and Planning) in 1990, the opportunities for amateur societies to undertake invasive archaeology, such as excavations, reduced greatly and so the Society has developed its use of non-invasive techniques such as ground resistivity analysis, and expanded its activities towards its other stated goal, that of education.

== Educational activities ==
A training programme was created in 2003 in association with Birkbeck College, University of London, in the area of post-excavation analysis. The first instance of this was run under the title “Post-Excavation: Analysis of materials from the Ted Sammes archive”, and resulted in a book published in 2006 in association with Birkbeck College and the Museum of London entitled The Last Hendon Farm: The archaeology and history of Church End Farm (ISBN 978-0-9503050-7-3). This book won a commendation at the British Archaeology Awards (BAA) in 2006 in the section for the Pitt-Rivers Award for the best project by a volunteer organisation.

The latest course in this series is entitled “Looking at Finds – A Practical Course in Post-Excavation Studies”, and is tutored by Jacqui Pearce BA, FSA, MlfA, of the Museum of London Archaeological Service (MoLAS). Under the UK Government's Equivalent or Lower Qualification regulations (ELQ) the cost of providing this course through Birkbeck College would have increased significantly and it is now provided independently by HADAS. In April 2011 HADAS and Jacqui Pearce were jointly awarded the Ralph Merrifield Award for London Archaeology for this course by LAMAS (London and Middlesex Archaeological Society).

Training excavations are performed for local schools, such as Hendon School and St Mary's CoE High School, Hendon, with the aim of introducing archaeological concepts and skills to young people. These excavations are operated in conjunction with the Widening Participation Initiative of University College London, University of London (UCL), and took place either in the school's own grounds or in those of the Church Farmhouse Museum in Hendon, a facility that has now closed. Barnet Council voted to withdraw funding from Church Farmhouse Museum, as well as Barnet Museum, from April 2011. The council's cabinet met on 13 December 2010 and approved the budget for 2010/2011 which included this proposal. There was a period of public consultation up to 17 January 2011, followed by a final recommendation by the Cabinet in February, as a result of which the museum closed on 31 March 2011.

A programme of monthly lectures on archaeological or historical topics is open to the public. Given by external subject-matter specialists, these take place on a Tuesday at Avenue House, East End Road, Finchley, N3 3QE.

HADAS also participates in the Council for British Archaeology’s annual Festival of British Archaeology, designed to stimulate public interest in archaeology, usually providing an active demonstration for the public, such as in 2009 a demonstration of Roman cookery techniques and kitchenware.

In 2010, the HADAS contribution to this festival was an excavation in the grounds of Church Farmhouse Museum, Hendon, and the survey and excavation of a Second World War public air-raid shelter and bunker complex in Sunny Hill Park, Hendon, in conjunction with Subterranea Britannica.
