= Mary Wardell =

- Born: 18 August 1832
- Died: 20 January 1917 (aged 84)
- Occupation: Philanthropist
- Known for: Establishing a scarlet fever hospital in London

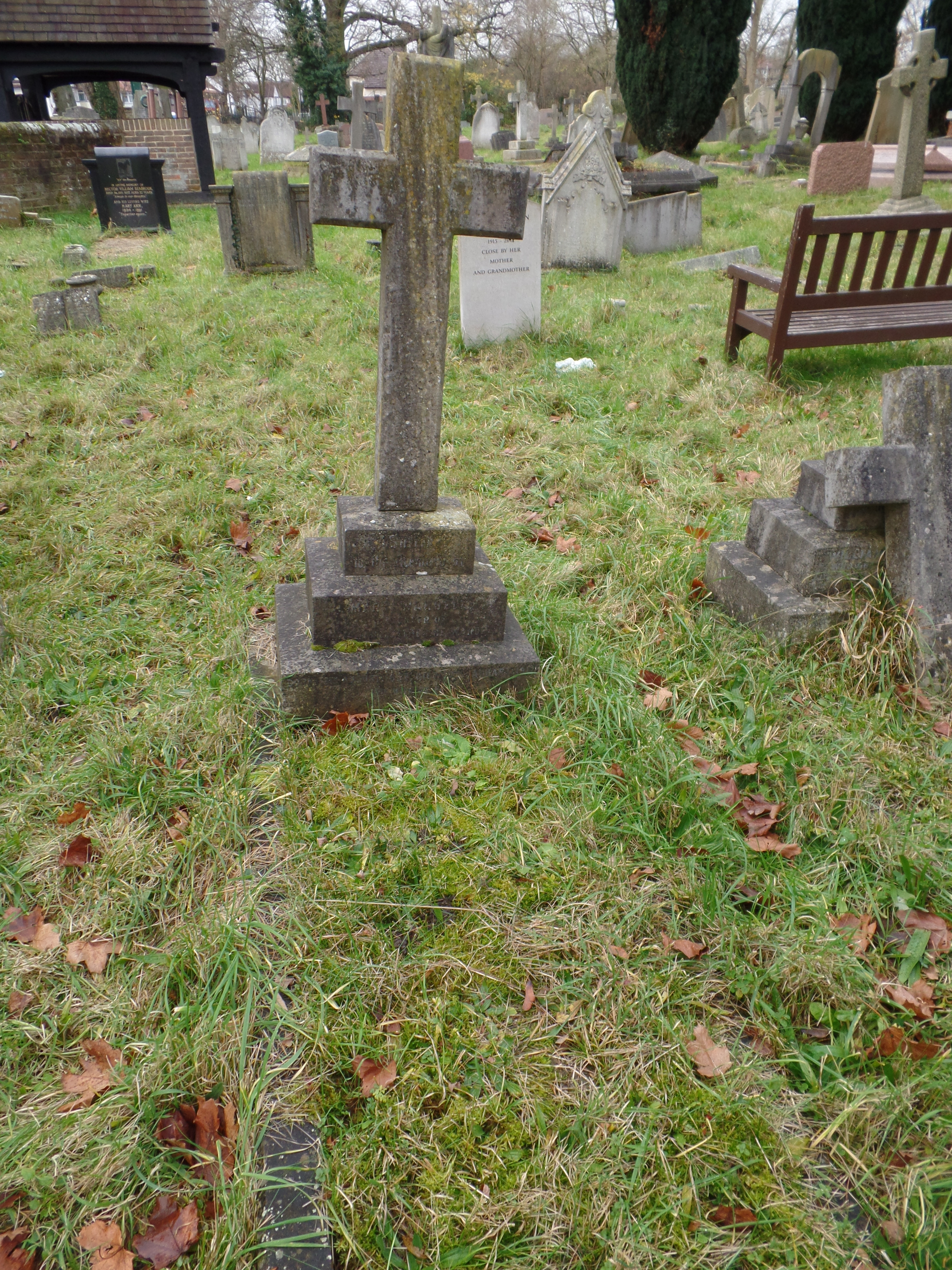

Mary Wardell (18 August 1832 – 20 January 1917) was a British philanthropist whose establishment for the treatment of Scarlet Fever reduced the prevalence of the infection in London.

== Hospital work ==
The daughter of a wine merchant, and educated at Queen's College, London, her idea for establishing a Scarlet Fever convalescent home was reported to have arisen from her work "among the poor of London" through Ellen Henrietta Ranyard's London Bible and Domestic Female Mission. Wardell's Convalescent Home for Scarlet Fever opened on the summit of Brockley Hill, Stanmore in 1884 after five years of fundraising and was still regarded as unique thirty years later.

Mary Wardell presented her initial idea to the physician Alexander Patrick Stewart whose introductions to other doctors, led her to secure in just six weeks the backing of many eminent medical men in the capital for the "project she had herself devised". Wardell later secured political support from the Prime Minister and his wife Catherine Gladstone and a meeting was held at Downing Street to advance the cause in March 1882. The Ladies' Sanitary Association, of which Catherine Gladstone was a patron, reported itself not only to have contributed a donation, but to have "worked assiduously to assist Miss Wardell". Royal patronage came from the Prince and Princess of Wales who opened the home in 1884.

Presiding at the first annual meeting was James Risdon Bennett, and Edward Henry Sieveking moved the meeting to accept the first annual report. Mary Wardell was not just the Secretary of the home but at times undertook the roles of matron and domestic as required and in due course she moved to premises next door named Sullonicae, after the Romano-British settlement of that name. One convalescent compared her to Father Damien. One patient was the composer Frederic Hymen Cowen in 1887, only months after having conducted benefit concerts for the home.

One early concession she made to her original plan was to extend her mission to patients of different social classes, resulting in the provision of somewhat segregated facilities. Despite differential charges for those more able to pay, fundraising continued to be required with all outstanding debts cleared in 1911 following a grant by the executors of Lady Goldsmid.

To counteract local suspicion, the nurses wore distinctive Turkey red uniforms, so that those fearful of infection could keep away from them. The Home also collected patients from their homes by a dedicated omnibus to reduce the likelihood of transmission.

At the time of her death in 1917, the home had been repurposed as an auxiliary military hospital for the treatment of Belgian and French soldiers. After the war, the site was acquired as the Country Branch of the Royal National Orthopaedic Hospital.

Mary Wardell is buried in the churchyard of St Lawrence, Little Stanmore, Middlesex, the parish in which the home was situated.
