= Brampton College =

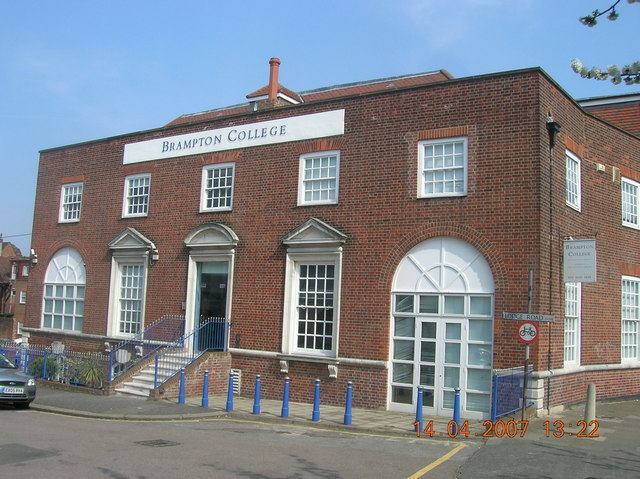
- Brampton College, Lodge Road at Junction with Chapel Walk

Location
- Lodge House, Lodge Road; Hendon, London, NW4 4DQ; United Kingdom

Information
- Type: Independent day school
- Founded: 1989
- Headmaster: John Wilson, MA (Oxon), PGCE (Cantab)
- Gender: co-educational
- Age: 15 to 19
- Publication: Brampton Bulletin
- Alumni: Old Bramptonians
- Website: http://www.bramptoncollege.com

Brampton College, London is a co-educational private sixth form college for students aged between 15 and 19 years, specialising in A levels and GCSEs. Founded in 1989 in Golders Green, it has been located in a period building in Hendon since 1998. The college has between 220 and 240 students.

== College buildings ==
The college is based in a period building on Lodge Road, Hendon, and a separate building known as 'the annex', It comprises 32 classrooms, including three science laboratories, and a library, study hall, art studio and offices. The college makes use of the indoor and outdoor sports facilities.

== Academics ==
Brampton College offers a breadth of subjects at A Level and GCSE, including Biology, Chemistry, Physics, Mathematics, Further Mathematics, Computer Science, Art, Photography, English, Film Studies, Religious Studies, French, Spanish, Italian, German, Latin, Classics, Economics, Business Studies, Psychology, Government & Politics, Sociology, Law, and Geography. A particular characteristic of the curriculum is flexibility: students are allowed to take a mixture of one-year, two-year and GCSE courses.

== A level Results 2024 ==
- 55% A*/A grades (national average 27.6% and independent school average 49.4%)
- 81% A*- B grades (national average 53.6%)
- 74% of applicants achieved a place at Russell group universities, including the University of Oxford, University of Cambridge, Imperial College, LSE, UCL, the University of Bristol and King’s College London.

Brampton College has a long history of achieving A level results. In the DfE league tables, they have been the top independent sixth form college in London for 22 years (out of last 23 years) for A level results.

A large number of pupils at Brampton attended top schools in the UK, including, Harrow School, Highgate School, University College School, The Haberdashers' Boys' School, The Haberdashers' School for Girls', Merchant Taylors' School for Boys', St Albans Boys School, Aldenham School, Jewish Free School, Immanuel College, North London Collegiate School, and Mill Hill School.

== School Fees ==
=== Two year A level course ===
Annual fees are £25,875 excluding VAT. The government has required all independent schools to charge 20% VAT on fees relating to 1 January 2025 onwards, part way through the current academic year. The result is that the total for the year including VAT is £29,153.

Fees for one year A level and GCSE courses are available on request.

There is a limited number of scholarships available to academically outstanding students expecting a minimum of 5 grade 8 or 9’s in their GCSEs, with the remainder grade 7 or above, and subject to means testing.
