= Sulloniacis =

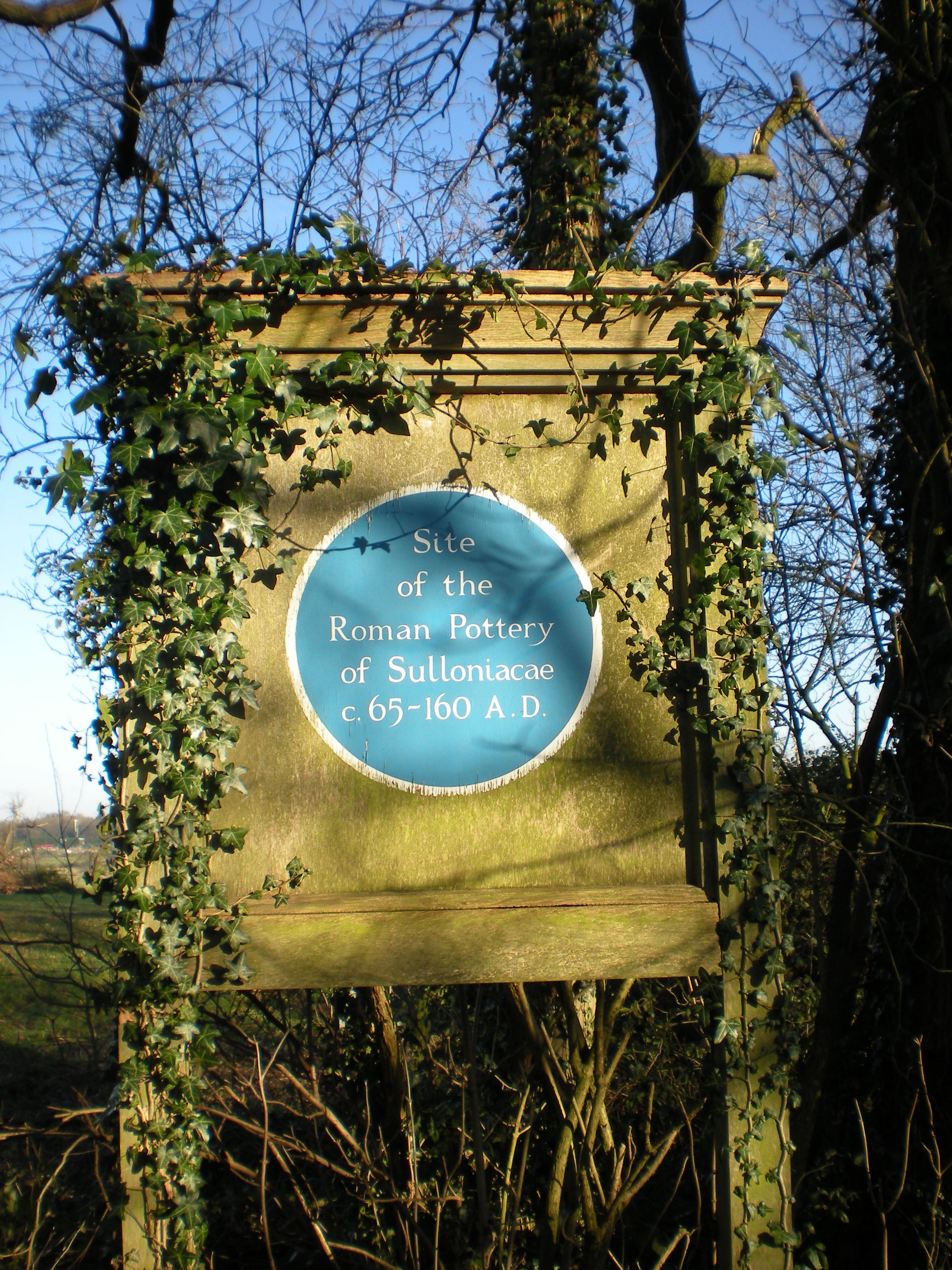

- Location in Greater London
- 51.63°N 0.3°W
- Location: England, UK
- OS grid reference: TQ174940

Sulloniacis or Sulloniacae was a mansio on the Roman road known as Watling Street in Roman Britain. Its existence is known from only one entry in the Antonine Itinerary, a listing of routes and facilities for the cursus publicus, the official courier service of the Roman Empire. Sulloniacis, which is recorded in Iter II (Itinerary II) for the route that ran between Portus Ritupis (Richborough, Kent) and Deva Victrix (Chester, Cheshire), was nine Roman miles from Verulamium (St Albans) and 12 from Londinium (London). Roman remains found at Brockley Hill near Edgware in the London Borough of Barnet have been identified as those of Sulloniacis.

== Toponym ==
The name may mean 'Estate of the family/descendants of Sullonios', Sullonios being a personal name which is not known from any other source. However, it could refer to a geographical feature.

== Location dispute ==
Research on Sulloniacis began in 1937. Since then, several small-scale excavations have found well-preserved remains of 14 kilns and workshops, clay extraction pits, puddling holes, wells, preparation floors and large accumulations of kiln waste. Evidence showed it had been occupied since AD 60 with production reaching a peak towards the end of the First Century AD. After pottery production ended around AD 160, it became a domestic settlement until the Fourth Century AD. This settlement being Sulloniacis mentioned in the Second Century AD Antonine Itinerary.

However, senior British archaeologist Harvey Sheldon, a specialist on Roman London from the Museum of London, has challenged the claim that the site found at Brockley Hill is Sulloniacis. Aside from the evidence of pottery production and some domestic buildings, modern excavations have failed to find any remains of mutationes (stations for changing horses) or mansiones (accommodation for official travellers). Sheldon suggested several alternative locations, particularly one further south in the vicinity of Edgware Road in Burnt Oak Broadway, a location where the Hendon and District Archaeological Society has already found Roman remains nearby.

However it is feasible that all these sites were within the boundaries of the estate named Sulloniacis, together with a possible Roman occupation site nearby on the hill at Hendon.

== Nature reserve ==
A 4.2 ha (10 acres) Site of Borough Importance for Nature Conservation, Grade II, located immediately south-east of the Brockley Hill archaeological site at Grid Ref TQ176940 has been named Sulloniacis Pastures. The site is on grassland which slopes up eastwards from the A41 road. Located on London Clay, it has many flowers typical of clay pasture, such as greater bird's-foot-trefoil and burnet-saxifrage.

== See also ==
- Nature reserves in Barnet
