= Sunny Hill Park =

Public park in Barnet, London, England

Coordinates: 51.597°N 0.230°W

Sunny Hill Park on a sunny spring afternoon

Sunny Hill Park is a park in Hendon, in the London Borough of Barnet, England. It is a large hilly park, 22 hectares, mainly grassed, which has extensive views to the north and the west. Together with the neighbouring Hendon Churchyard, it is a Site of Local Importance for Nature Conservation.

The site used to be Sunnyhill Fields, and was owned by the adjoining Church Farmhouse, which housed the Church Farmhouse Museum until 2011. In 1921 Hendon Council purchased 16 acres for a park, which opened in 1922, and in 1929 it was enlarged when further land was acquired. An area with scattered trees in the south-east corner was formerly part of St Mary's Churchyard, an important archaeological site with evidence of Roman and Anglo-Saxon occupation. The park still has hedgerows showing former field boundaries and mature trees.

It has a cafe, a playground, various tennis and basketball courts and football pitches.

There is access from Church End, Sunny Hill, Watford Way, Great North Way, Sunny Gardens Road, Sunningfields Crescent and Church Terrace.

== Gallery ==
Sunny Hill Park landscape

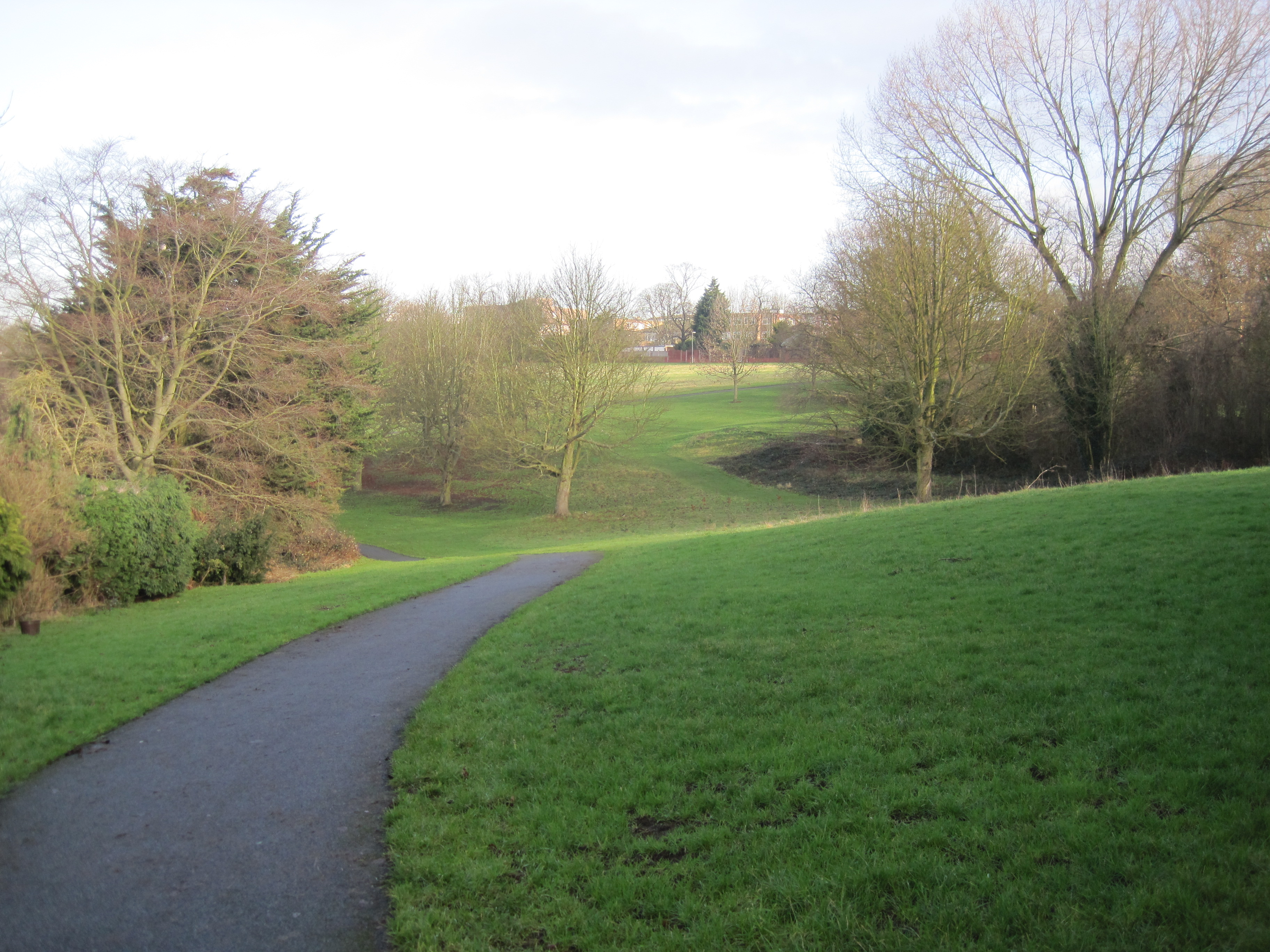
Sunny Hill Park from southern end

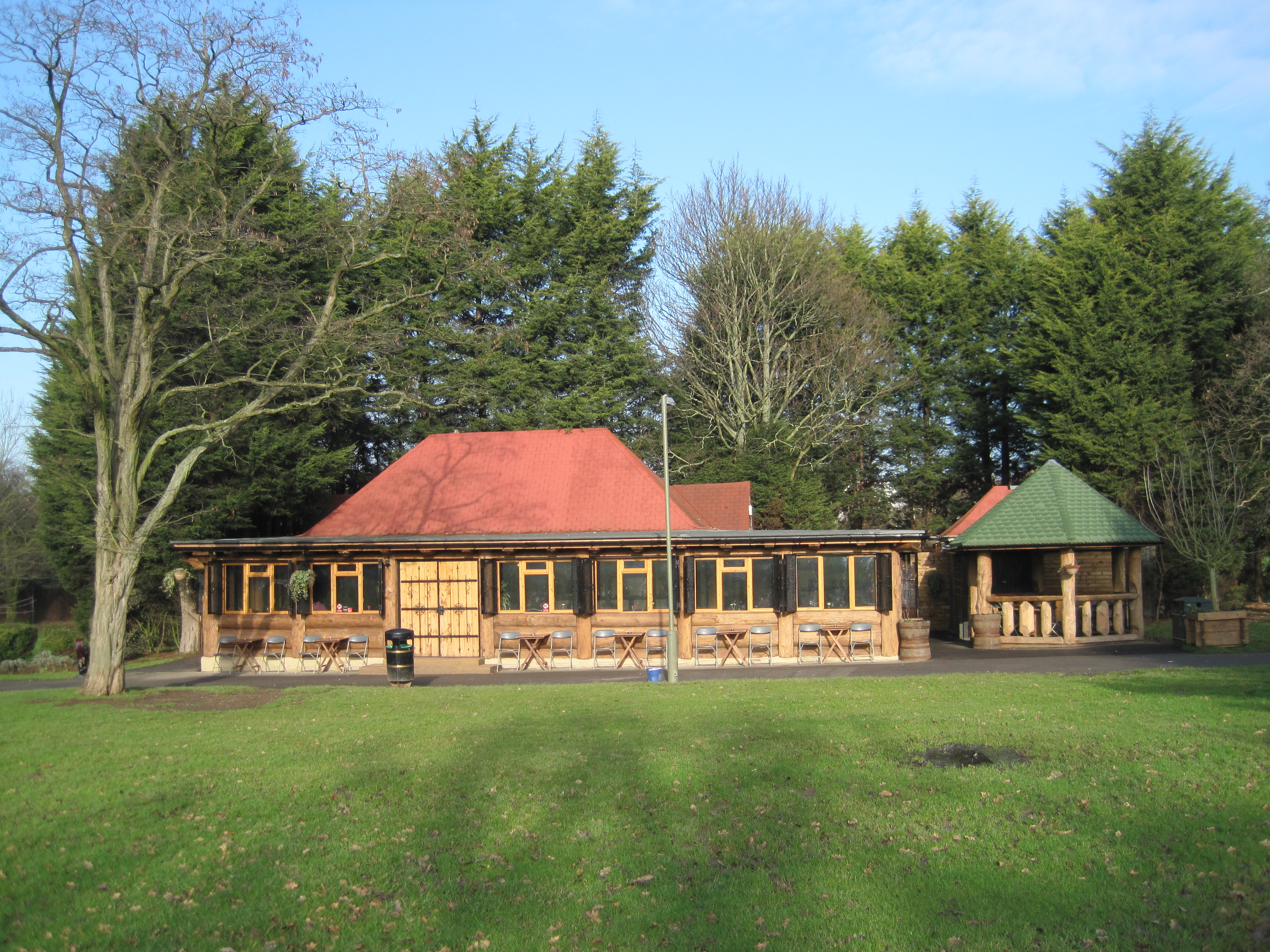
Sunny Hill Park cafe

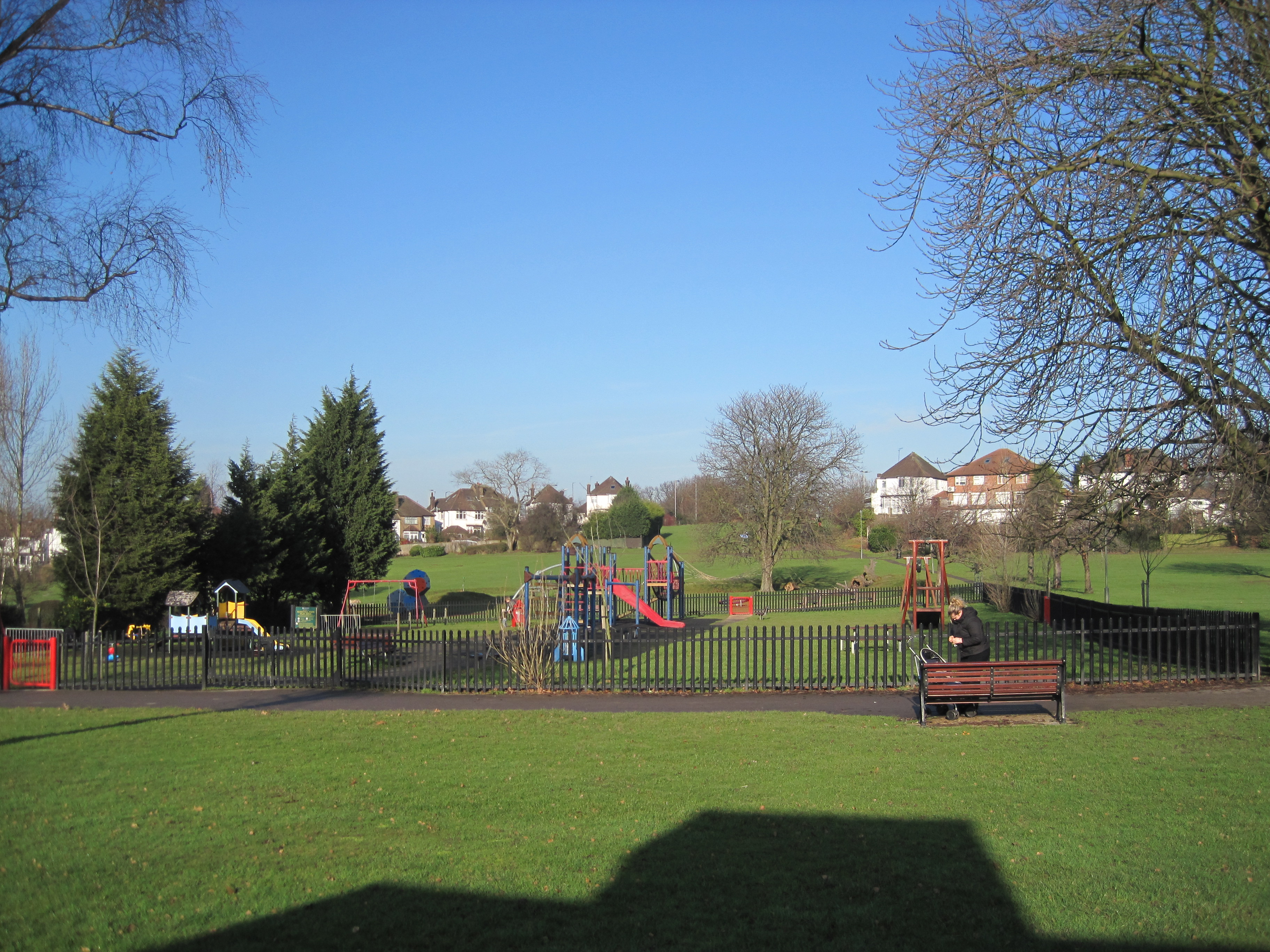
Sunny Hill Park playground

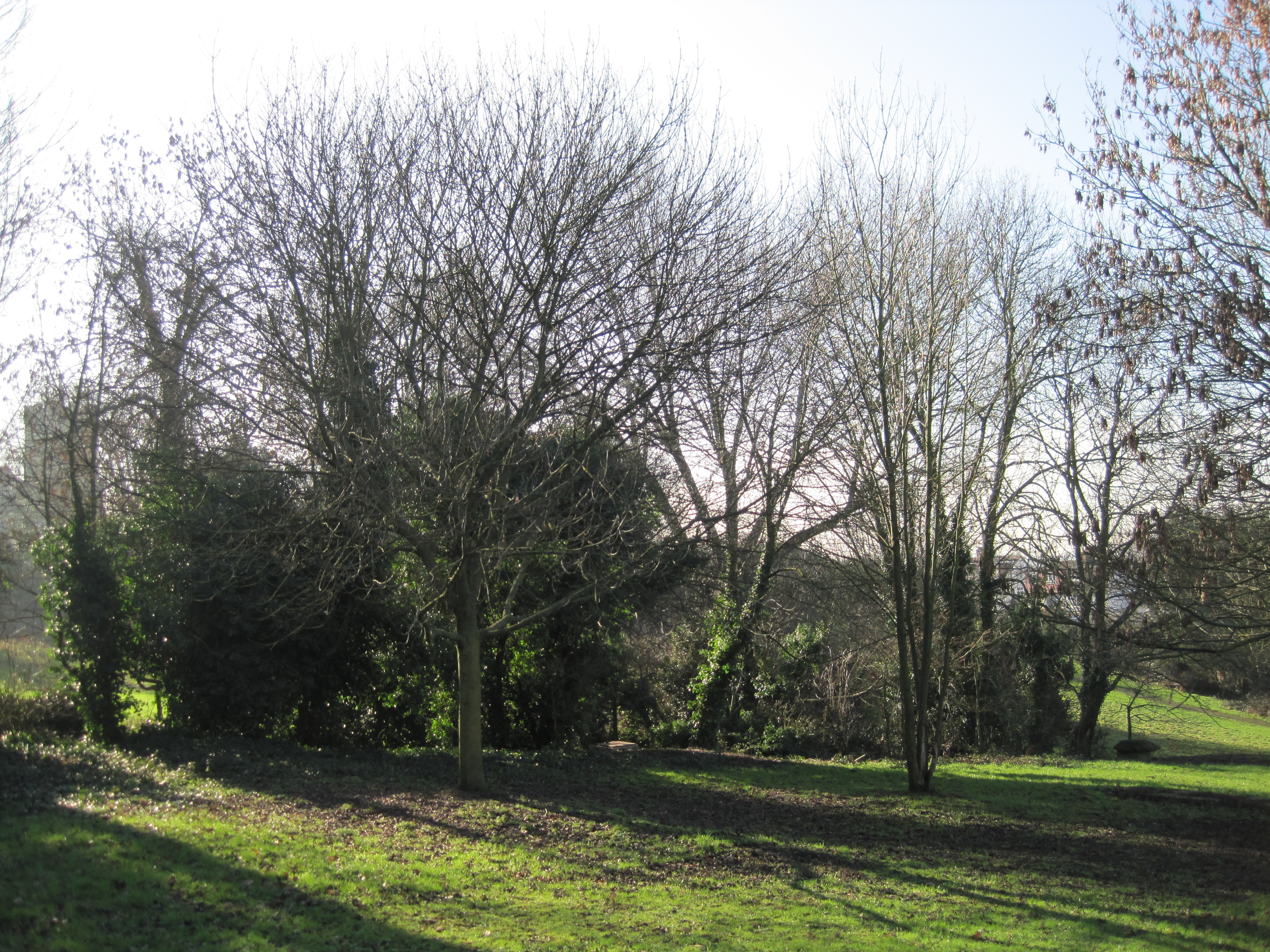
South east corner of Sunny Hill Park

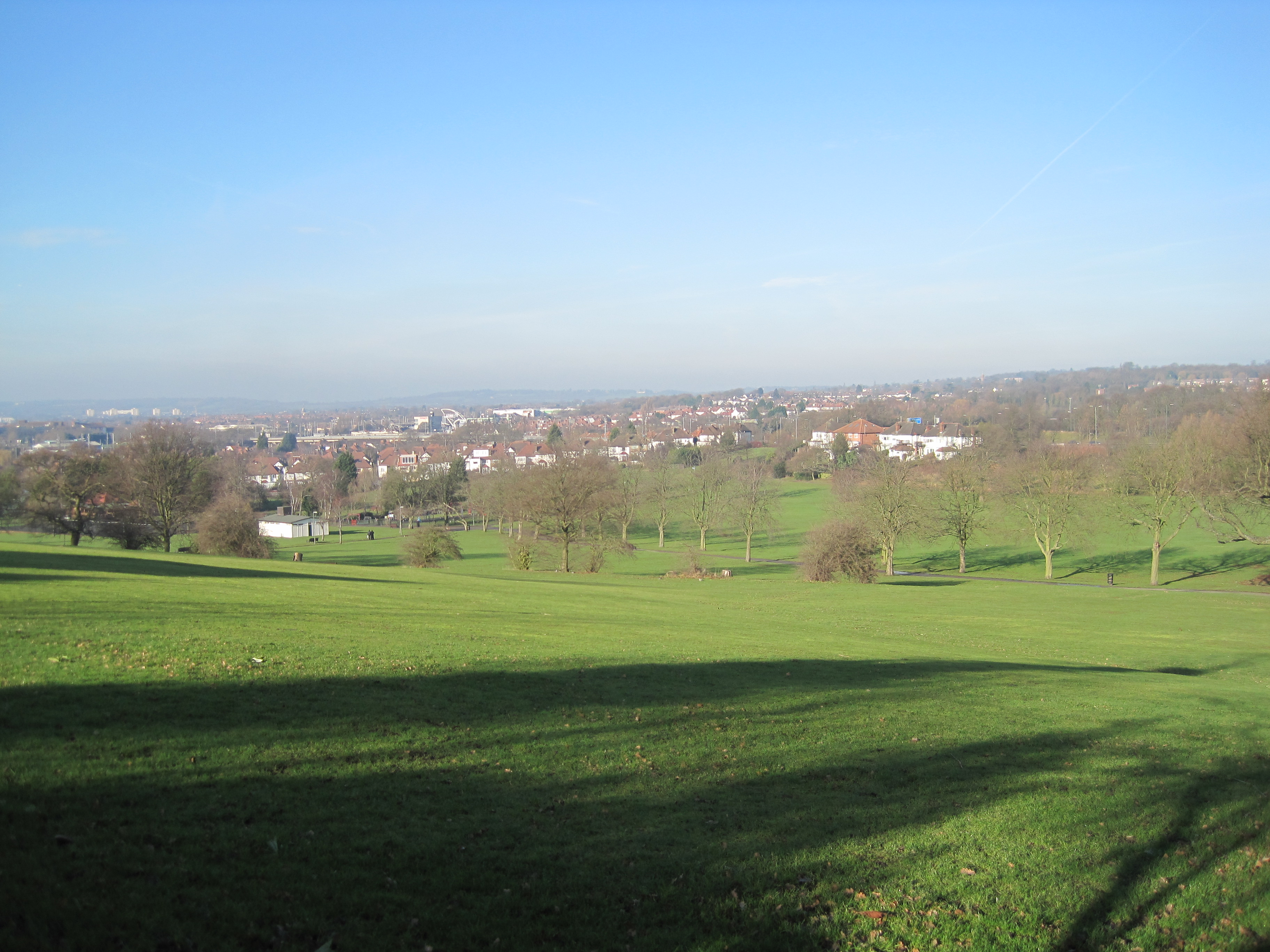
View north from Sunny Hill Park

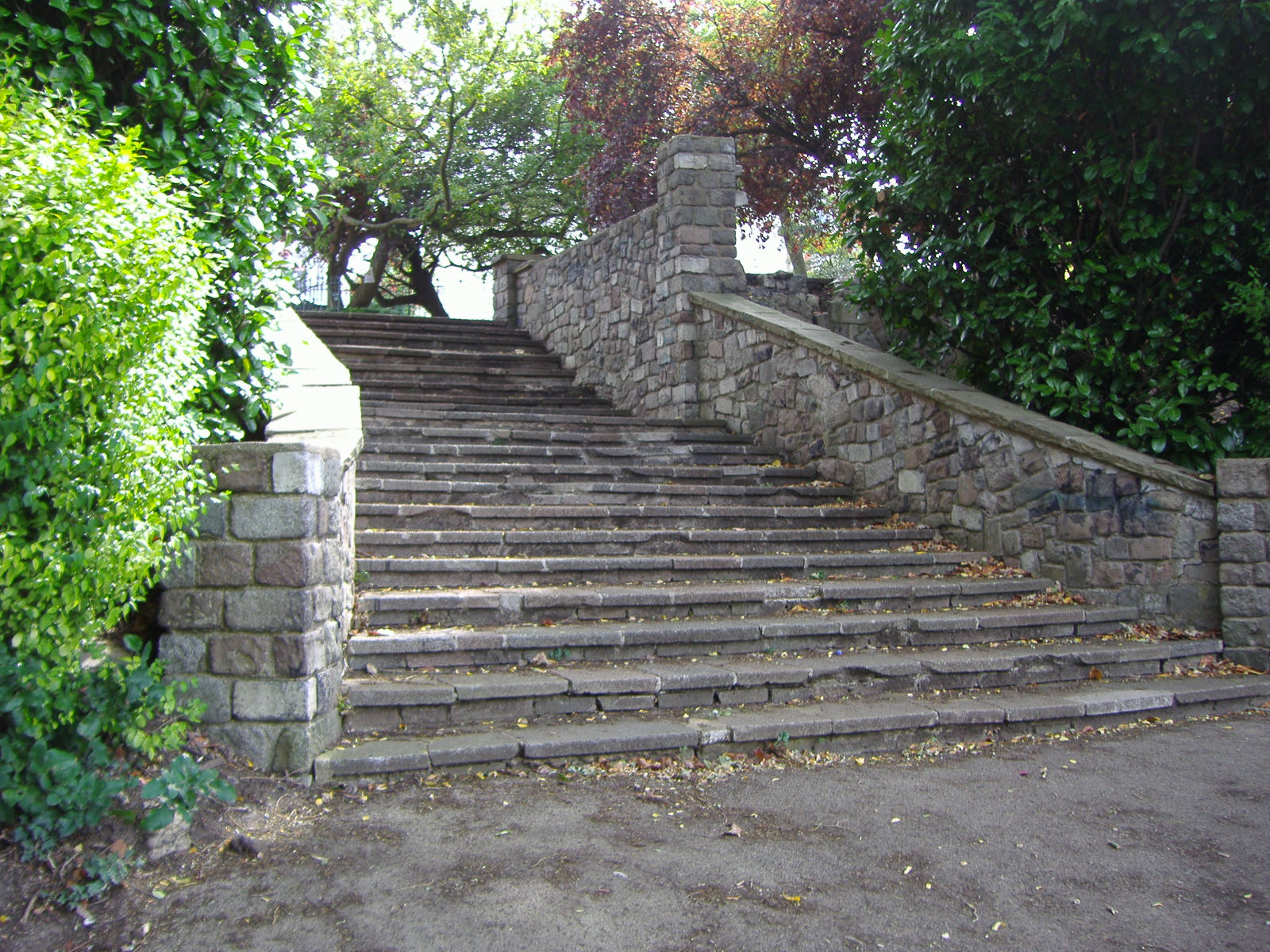
Steps at Sunny Hill Park

== See also ==
- Barnet parks and open spaces
- Nature reserves in Barnet
