= Brockley Hill =

Area of high ground in England

Coordinates: 51.63°N 0.3°W

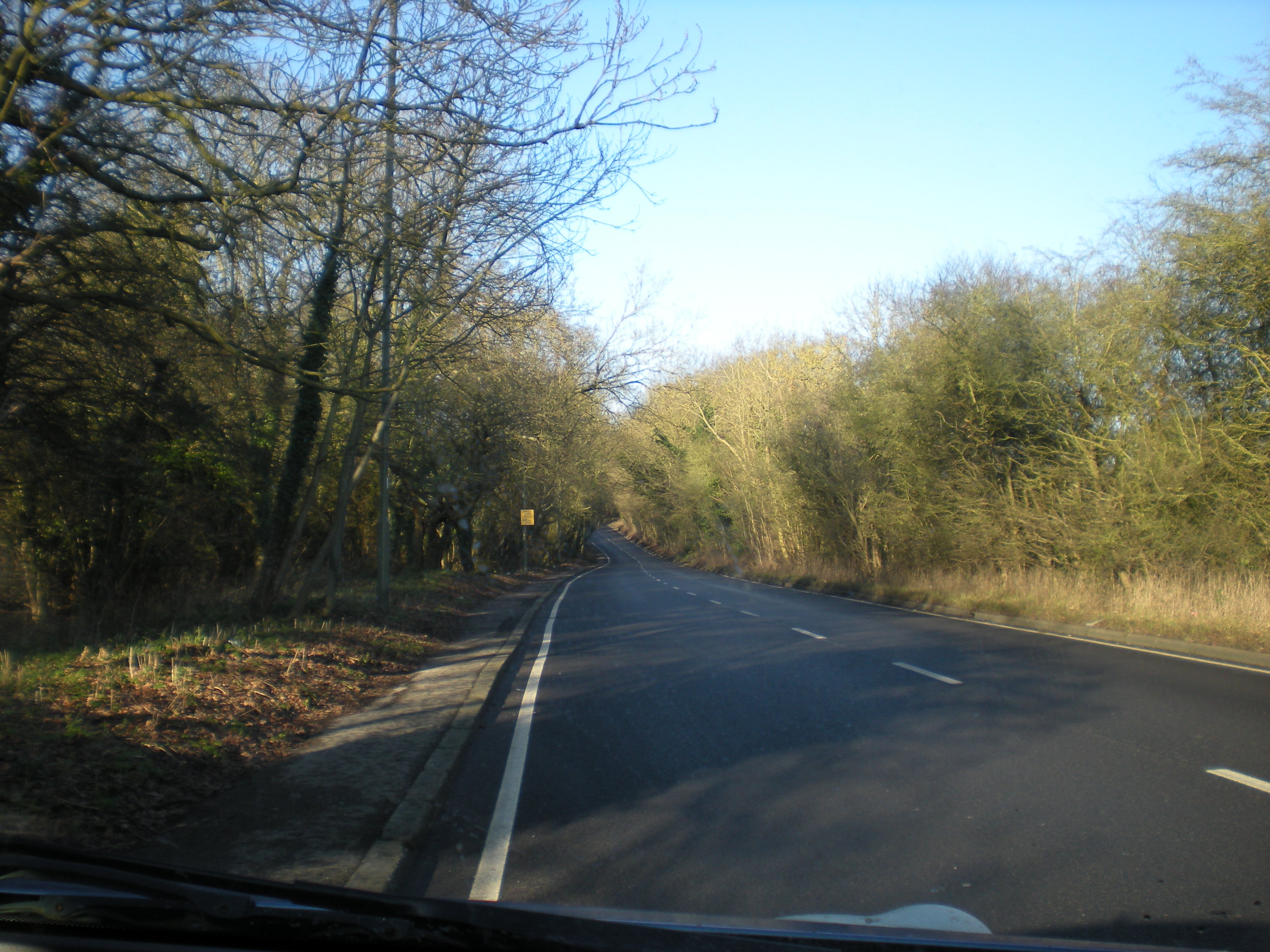
- A5 road northwards over Brockley Hill

- Location within Greater London
- OS grid reference: TQ174940
- London borough: Harrow
- Ceremonial county: Greater London
- Region: London
- Country: England
- Sovereign state: United Kingdom
- Post town: HARROW
- Postcode district: HA7
- Dialling code: 020
- London Assembly: Brent and Harrow

Brockley Hill, Stanmore, is an area of high ground on the outskirts of North London, England. The hill, which rises to 136 metres (446 ft) above sea level, is traversed by the A5 road. It follows the course of the Roman road known as Watling Street. The hill is also associated with the Roman archaeological site called Sulloniacis. The Royal National Orthopaedic Hospital is based at Brockley Hill.

== Etymology ==
In its present form the name dates from the 16th century; the earlier form was Brokhole(s): 'badger-holes', from the old English and Celtic word Brock. The sandy soil of the hill-top is more attractive to burrowing animals like badgers, than the heavy London clay of the surrounding areas.

== Geography ==
=== Geology ===
Brockley Hill is the eastern arm of a long hill centred on Stanmore. The top of the hill is capped with "Stanmore Gravel", which is the remnant of a layer of gravel laid down by a river system pre-dating the Thames. Under the gravel are layers of sand, silt and clay about 15 metres thick known as the Claygate Beds. Below this is London Clay about 70 metres thick. This arrangement is typical of hills bounding the Thames Valley.

=== Roads ===
The A5 trunk road runs across the summit of Brockley Hill using the same alignment of the highway (also known as Watling Street) built by the Romans in the 1st century AD. The southerly approach climbs to a height of 70 m (230 ft) in a distance of 1,400 m (0.87 mi) from the junction of Spur Road, Edgware. The area might be the location of Sulloniacis, a way point for the Cursus publicus (Roman Imperial mail service). A smaller Roman road is supposed to have branched off from the top of Brockley Hill in the direction of Watford, King's Langley, Berkhampstead, and Tring, however, there is no evidence of this route according to studies of the parish boundaries. On the northerly descent, the highway drops 30 m (98 ft) to Elstree Hill Roundabout over 600 m (0.37 mi). Although both sections of Roman road approaching Brockley Hill are straight, a direct course across the summit was abandoned in favour of a double-bend alignment. This was employed to alleviate ascent of the hill because of the steepness in the terrain.

The M1 motorway and the A41 Watford Way trunk road both pass through the valley between Brockley Hill and Elstree Hill to the North.

=== Administrative area ===
Brockley Hill was in Stanmore, Gore Hundred, in the County of Middlesex until the abolition of Middlesex in 1965. Since then the road named Brockley Hill, including the properties on both sides of it, and all the fields and properties to the west, are in Stanmore, in the London Borough of Harrow; the fields to the east of the road are in Edgware, London Borough of Barnet.

=== Nearby places ===
- Stanmore
- Edgware
- Bushey Heath
- Elstree
- Borehamwood
- Mill Hill

== History ==
Brockley Hill is situated on the ancient Watling Street, which was improved during the early part of the Roman occupation. The section running roughly North from Marble Arch runs in a straight line as far as the summit of Brockley Hill, following which there is a double curve to meet the alignment of the next section. The Roman engineers' practice was to use a high point as a sighting-point and clearly Brockley Hill was used in this way. The sandy clay found at the top of the hill was used for the manufacture of pottery during the Roman period, and it was one of the most important potteries in southern Britain in the later first century. The area was known as Sulloniacis in the Roman period.

The antiquarian Daniel Lysons noted the long history of Roman finds in the area in his 1795 book The Environs of London: volume 3: County of Middlesex and quoted a country proverb: "No heart can think, nor tongue can tell, what lies between Brockley-hill and Pennywell", which he interprets in terms of finding Roman treasure. Pennywell is in Elstree, some 1,500 metres north of Brockley Hill. What now lies between Brockley Hill and Pennywell includes eight lanes of fast moving traffic, as both the M1 motorway and the A41 Watford Bypass pass through this area.

The Eastern end of the Dark Ages linear earthwork known as Grim's Ditch or Grimsdyke is close to Brockley Hill.

Bricks were made on the hill in the 18th century.

The Mary Wardell Convalescent Home was founded on the summit in 1882 and the premises were bought to be the Country Branch of the Royal National Orthopaedic Hospital in 1920.

In the 1930s, an extension of the London Underground's Northern line was planned to run from Edgware to Bushey Heath. Brockley Hill station would have been situated at the southern foot of Brockley Hill; however, the work was abandoned at the outbreak of World War II. The lower courses of a brick viaduct – that would have carried the line through the station – are still visible in 'Arches Field'. With the passing of the Town and Country Planning Act 1947, the line was deemed unnecessary because the planned housing developments around Brockley Hill were banned within the newly defined Metropolitan Greenbelt.
