= Gore Hundred =

Historical division of Middlesex, England

Coordinates: 51.59°N 0.28°W

Location of Gore Hundred within Middlesex.

Gore was a hundred of the historic county of Middlesex, England.

The hundred's name means 'piece of ground shaped like the head of a spear/triangle'.

== Scope and importance ==
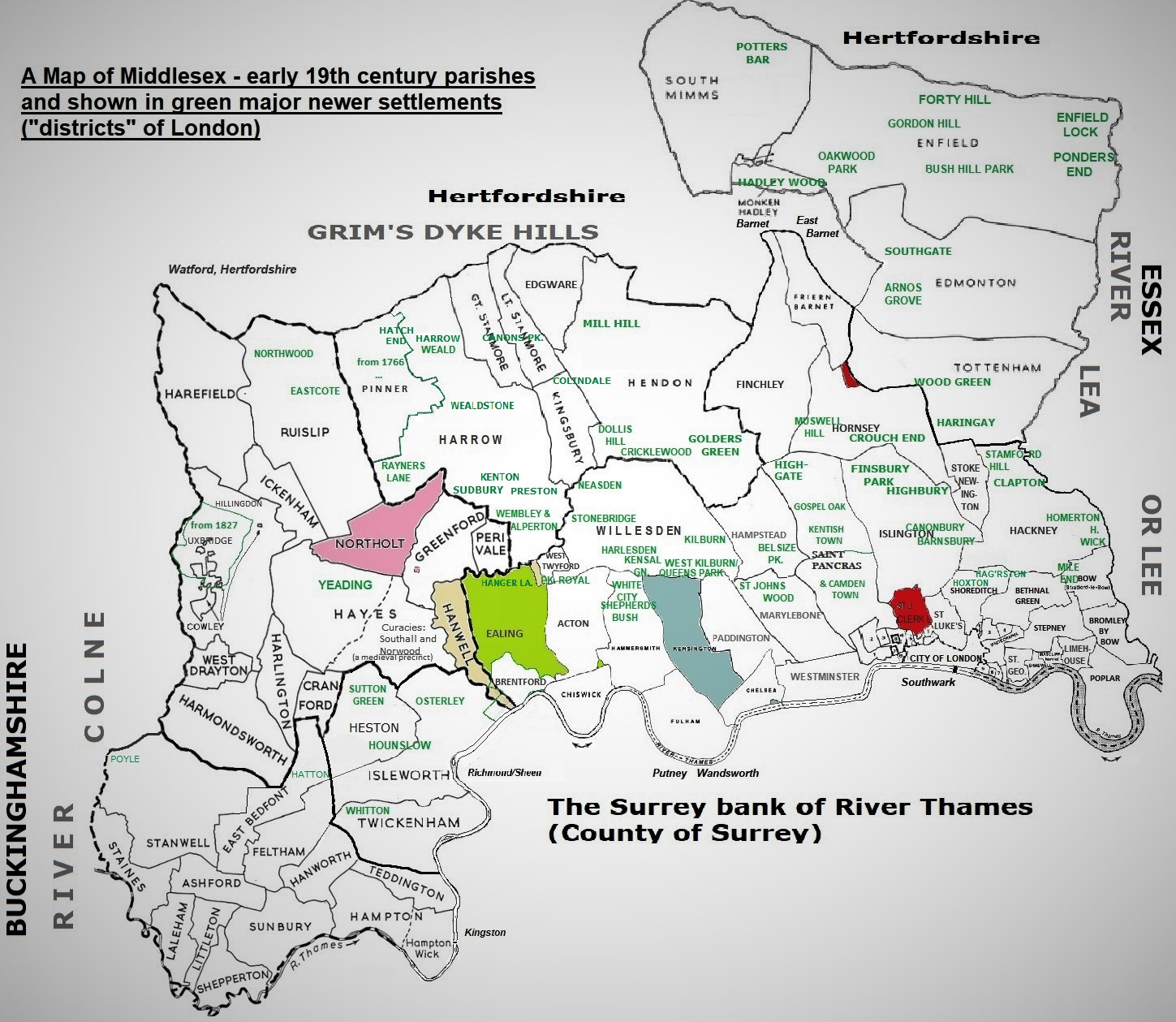
The parishes and major newer settlements in the Hundred.
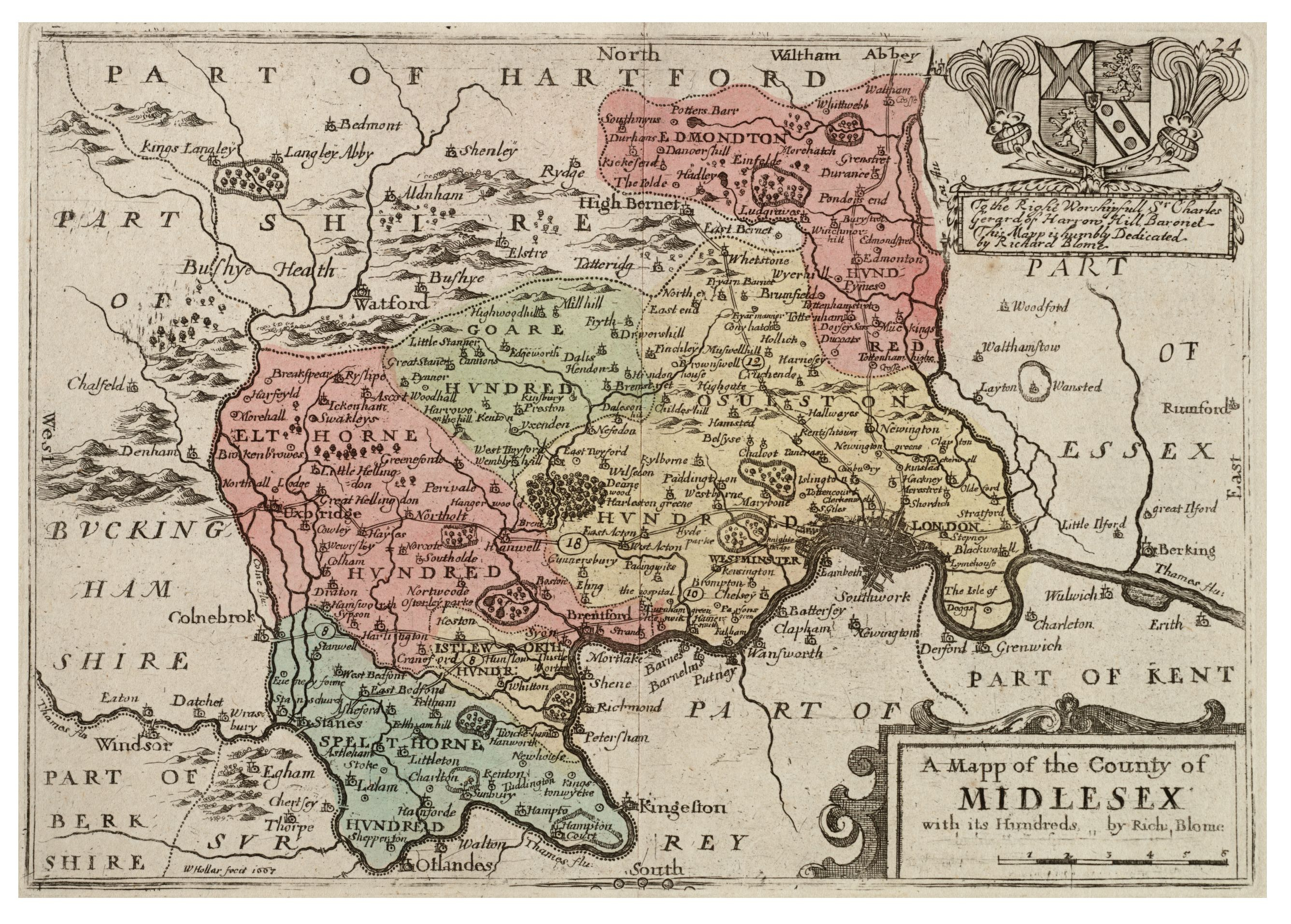
Map of the county engraved by Wenceslaus Hollar (d.1677). The northern green portion shows manors and villages in Gore hundred seen as most notable. Not confined to those with a church, many of the then-largest estates or simply estates of greatest houses have become obsolete.

It covered an area in the north of the county, in present London Boroughs roughly that of Harrow, one third of Barnet (including Hendon and Edgware) and about a third of Brent, plus part of Elstree, historically divided between Hertfordshire and Middlesex. Per the relatively frequent central medieval records of all major estates including the Domesday Book, Feet of Fines (premiums on estates being transferred), Assize Rolls and subsidy rolls its parishes were:

Parish	Part of hundred covered
Edgware	Small parish along northern border
Harrow	Western two-fifths of the hundred roughly. The parent parish of Wembley, Alperton and Sudbury.
Hendon	Eastern third of the hundred approximately
Kingsbury	Small parish on the near, southern border of the Hundred
Great Stanmore	Strip parish in the north, adjoining Harrow and others
Little Stanmore	Strip parish in the north, adjoining Edgware and others
Pinner	A chapelry of Harrow until 1766. The north-west quarter of Harrow.

By the end of the 15th century (due to subinfeudation) some 22 manors were in the Hundred. From an early date, the jurisdiction exercised by the Hundred was minuscule. Of the manors, only Great Stanmore did not, at some time before, 1300 enjoy or claim exemption from the Hundred Court. The Hundred also comprised several franchises, notably including those of Westminster Abbey and the Archbishop of Canterbury, and view of frankpledge and other liberties to the noble owner of Edgware and to St Bart's (the Great) Priory, Smithfield, London who acquired Little Stanmore.

== See also ==
- HA postcode area and to a lesser extent NW postcode area; most of the HA post towns and numbered divisions are based on the old parishes but reshaped for post service convenience.
