= Hendon =

Area of Barnet in London, England

Coordinates: 51.5837°N 0.2252°W

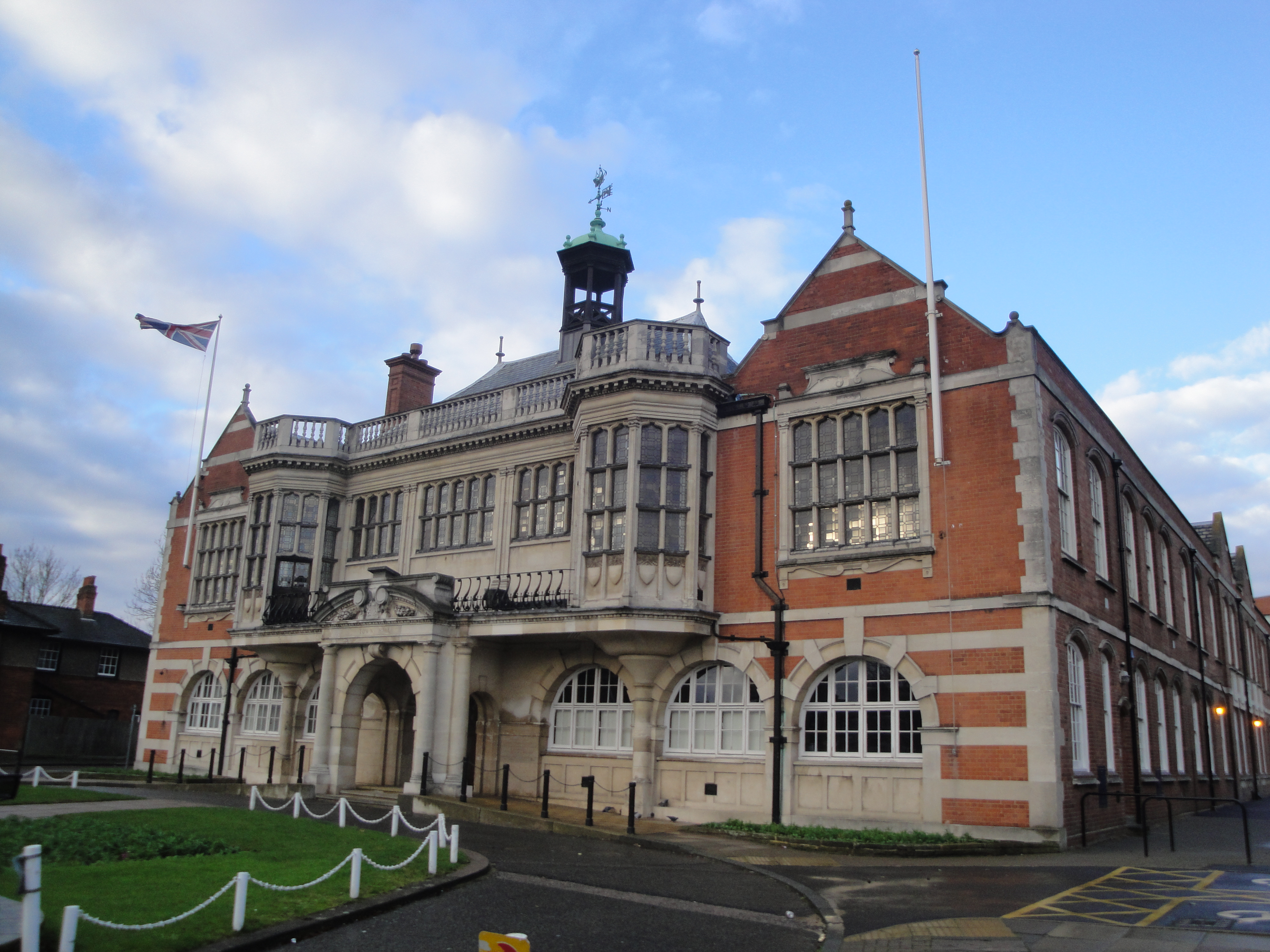
- Hendon Town Hall

- Location within Greater London
- Population: 35,874 (2011 Census)
- OS grid reference: TQ229887
- London borough: Barnet
- Ceremonial county: Greater London
- Region: London
- Country: England
- Sovereign state: United Kingdom
- Post town: LONDON
- Postcode district: NW4, NW9
- Dialling code: 020
- Police: Metropolitan
- Fire: London
- Ambulance: London
- UK Parliament: Hendon
- London Assembly: Barnet and Camden

Hendon is an urban area in the London Borough of Barnet, 7 miles (11 km) northwest of Charing Cross. Hendon was an ancient manor and parish in the county of Middlesex and a former borough, the Municipal Borough of Hendon; it has been part of Greater London since 1965. Hendon falls almost entirely within the NW4 postcode, while the West Hendon part falls in NW9. Colindale to the northwest was once considered part of Hendon but is today separated by the M1 motorway.

The district is most famous for the London Aerodrome which later became the RAF Hendon; from 1972 the site of the RAF station was gradually handed over to housing development and to the Royal Air Force Museum London. The railways reached Hendon in 1868 with Hendon station on the Midland Main Line, followed by the London Underground further east under the name Hendon Central in 1923. Brent Street emerged as its commercial centre by the 1890s. A social polarity was developed between the uphill areas of Hendon and the lowlands around the railway station.

Hendon is located by numerous arterial roads, namely the A41, A406 (North Circular), the A1 and the M1 motorway. Today Hendon is home to rugby union club Saracens F.C. based at Copthall, and is also home to Middlesex University. It is represented in parliament by its namesake constituency which also includes Edgware and Mill Hill.

== History and locale ==
Hendon (parish) population
| 1881 | 10,484 |
| 1891 | 15,843 |
| 1901 | 22,450 |
| 1911 | 38,806 |
| 1921 | 56,013 |
◄ Edgware parish absorbed
| 1931 | 115,682 |
| 1941 | war # |
| 1951 | 155,857 |
| 1961 | 151,843 |
# no census was held due to war
source: UK census

The name means the high place or down, and Hendon's motto is Endeavour. Hendon was historically a civil parish in the hundred of Gore, county of Middlesex. The manor is described in Domesday (1087), but the name 'Hendun' – meaning 'at the highest hill' – is of earlier origin. Evidence of Roman settlement was discovered by members of the Hendon and District Archaeological Society and others; an urn burial of a headless child was found in Sunny Hill Park.

The Midland Railway and the Great Northern Railways were built through Hendon in the 1860s. The underground (Northern line) arrived at Golders Green to the south in 1907, the line being extended to Hendon Central, Colindale and Edgware in 1923–24.

Much of the area developed into a suburb of London and now the area is mostly built-up with some countryside in the Mill Hill area, such as the Copthall playing fields. Hendon's industry was mostly centred on manufacturing, and included motor and aviation works, and developed from the 1880s. In 1931 the civil parish of Edgware was abolished and its area was added to the great civil parish of Hendon. This meant Hendon covered everywhere from Edgware and Mill Hill down to Golders Green, Childs Hill and Hampstead Garden Suburb.

Hendon became an urban district in 1894. In 1932 the urban district became the Municipal Borough of Hendon. The municipal borough was abolished in 1965 and the area became part of the London Borough of Barnet.

In 1976, Brent Cross Shopping Centre was built and opened at the southern end of Hendon, to the north of the North Circular Road.

In April 2026, an Iranian-linked group allegedly committed an arson attack on a Hendon synagogue.

=== Church End ===
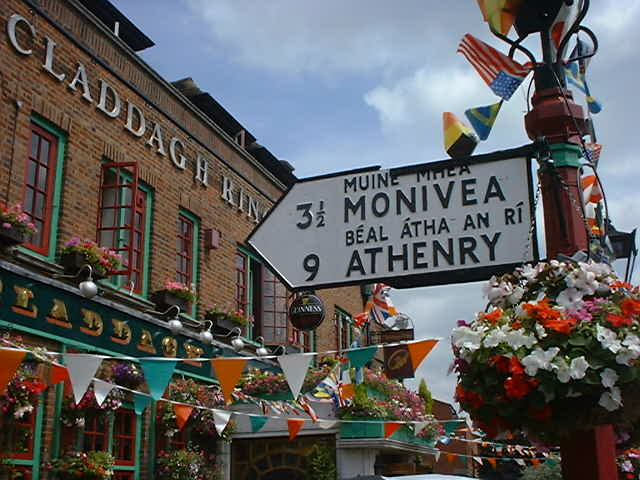
The Claddagh Ring pub.

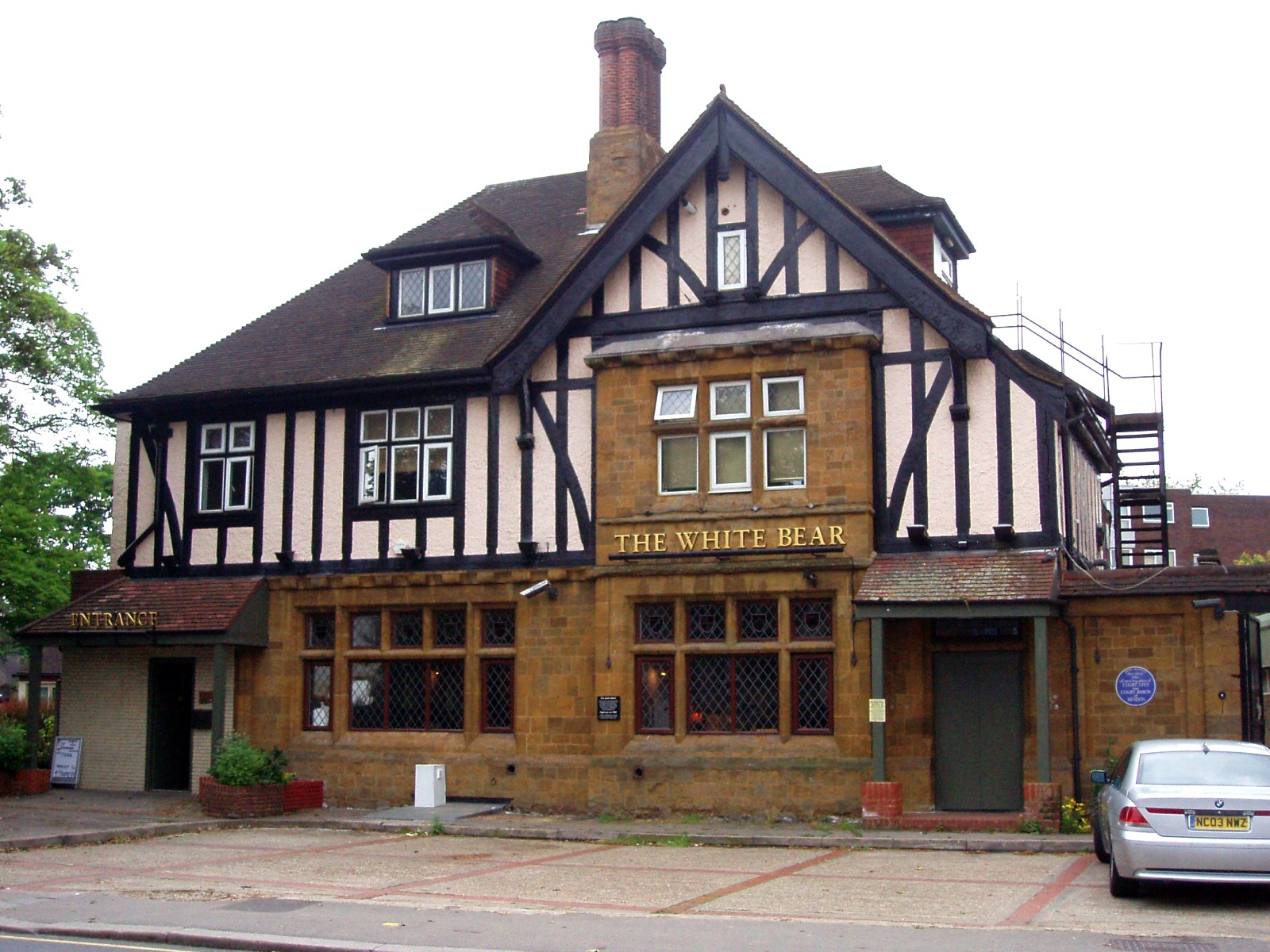
The former White Bear pub

Hendon and District Archaeological Society has found a number of interesting Roman artifacts at Church End but nothing conclusive, and the Saxon settlement near to St Mary's Church may not be a continuation of its Roman predecessor. The Domesday Survey mentions a priest, and a church building was documented in 1157. The oldest fabric of the present church is 13th century. The 50 ft tower (c1450) was much restored in the 18th century when the weathercock in the form of a "Lamb and Flag", the badge of St John, was added.

However, the church is dedicated to St Mary, an enigma that defies local historians to this day. It may be a sign of the (heretical) cult of Mary Magdalene said to have been promoted by the Templars and their successors. Eastern extensions carried out between 1913–15 to designs by architect Temple Moore have greatly expanded the church.

Sir Stamford Raffles, founder of Singapore in 1819, died at his home in nearby Mill Hill and is buried in the church. Another grave of distinction in the churchyard is that of football manager Herbert Chapman who had great success in charge of Northampton Town, Leeds City, Huddersfield Town and finally Arsenal before his sudden death from pneumonia in 1934. Bram Stoker may well have had St Mary's graveyard in mind when he created the fictional "Kingstead", the uneasy resting place of Lucy Westenra, in his book Dracula. However, St Mary's graveyard is also the resting place of a more benign spirit, Coventry Patmore's wife Emily, the model for the poem The Angel in the House (1854), and upon whom the Victorian ideal of domesticity "the Angel of the Hearth" is based.

Adjacent to the church at the top of Greyhound Hill is the Greyhound pub, which was rebuilt in 1898. Originally called the Church House, it was used for vestry meetings from the 1600s to 1878. In 1676 the inn, by then known as the Greyhound, burned down in a fire. In 1855 a fire brigade was established, renamed the Hendon volunteer fire brigade in 1866, and a manual fire engine was kept in a building near the church.

Further west, adjacent to the Greyhound pub, is the oldest building in Hendon, a 17th-century farmhouse which became the former Church Farmhouse Museum (1955–2011), now part of the campus of nearby Middlesex University.

The Claddagh Ring pub, originally known as The Midland Arms, in Church Road, Hendon, is somewhat more than nine miles from Athenry (see photo). The sign is genuinely Irish, giving pleasure to a significant Irish community in this area. Another pub, the Midland Hotel, close to Hendon station, was opened in 1890 by The Midland Railway Company to provide liquid refreshment for commuters using the Midland Railway. At the time when both of these pubs were open The Midland Arms (The Claddagh Ring) was known as The Upper Midland and The Midland Hotel was known as The Lower Midland. The Irish connection with Hendon goes back at least to the early 19th century when many of that country came here to make the hay, for which Hendon was then famous.

=== The Burroughs ===
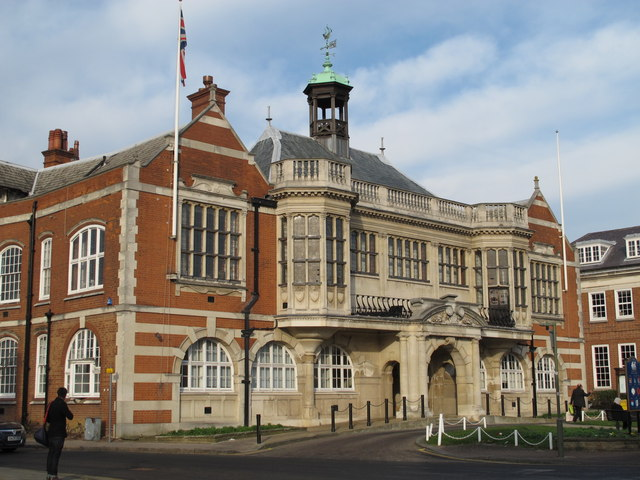
Hendon town hall

The Burroughs was a distinct hamlet until the 1890s, and appears on an 1873 Ordnance Survey map of the area. The name, known from 1316 until the 19th century as 'the burrows', doubtless refers to the keeping of rabbit warrens.

There was an inn and brew-house by the 16th century for travellers, very possibly the White Bear, which was so-called from 1736, and was rebuilt in 1932. Here, the 'leet courts', based on feudal tradition, were held as late as 1916, to ensure the rights of the Lord of the manor to control the increasingly emancipated peasantry, to punish transgressors, and to fix 'Quit-Rent' for those who had built on manorial land and wastes.

By 1697 the inn was the location for Hendon's Whitsun fair. Originally an un-chartered hiring fair for local hay farmers, it was also renowned for dancing and country sports, and was immortalised in the lines of a song of the 1810s:

Then a soldier fond of battle,
Who has fought and bled in Spain,
Finds in Hendon air his mettle,
Well stirred up to fight again.
Then a justice of the Quorum
At Burroughs revels, Hendon Fair,
Finds such order and decorum
At the White and Funny Bear.

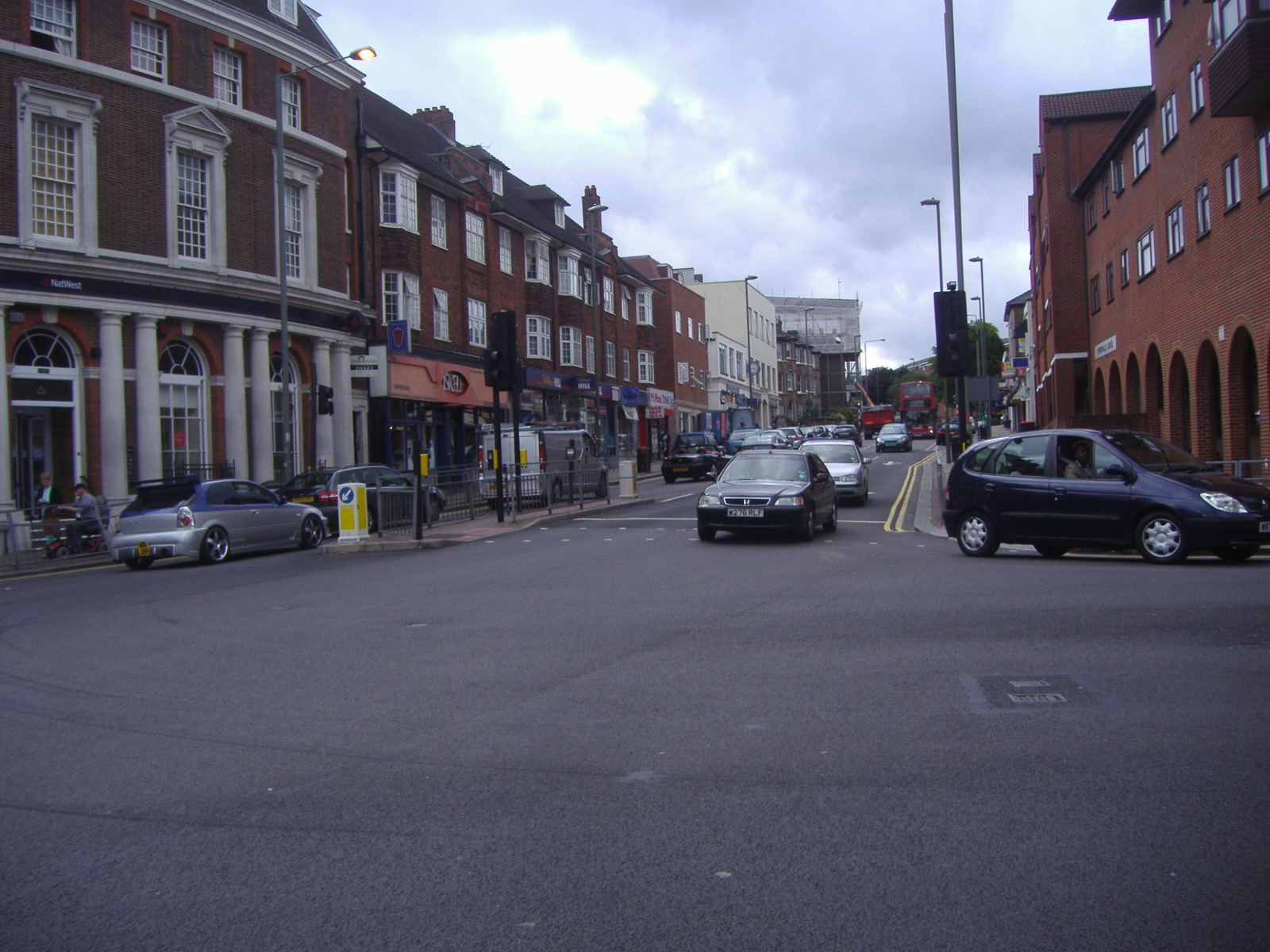
The Burroughs

There was cockfighting during the 1820s, and horse racing in the 1860s; by this time, haymakers were usually contracted directly from Ireland.

From 1735 until 1934 a poorhouse with six cottages used to house older parishioners (and sometimes wrongly called 'alms-houses') stood where Quadrant Close (occupied by 1936) is now located. The Poor Law workhouse ceased to be operational when 'Hendon Union Workhouse' opened in 1835, in what was then 'Red Hill' and is now Burnt Oak. With the foundation of a Local Board in 1879, the buildings were later used as offices.

In this same period, three religious institutions were established. The first was a Methodist chapel in 1827, which was reached by the footpath of the same name. The second was a Roman Catholic chapel, later called Our Lady of Dolours (1863, remodelled 1927). There were a handful of shops nearby by the 1880s. The modern Methodist chapel, designed by Welch & Lander, was built in 1937.

Grove House (or Hendon Grove), built before 1753, was a private psychiatric hospital by 1900; it was demolished in 1933, having already lost much of its original frontage for building. The remaining estate became a public park, with rumours of a secret tunnel. A number of picturesque 18th- and 19th-century houses survive. The Poor Handmaids of Jesus Christ established the Convent of St Joseph, in 1882, and had added a school by 1900.

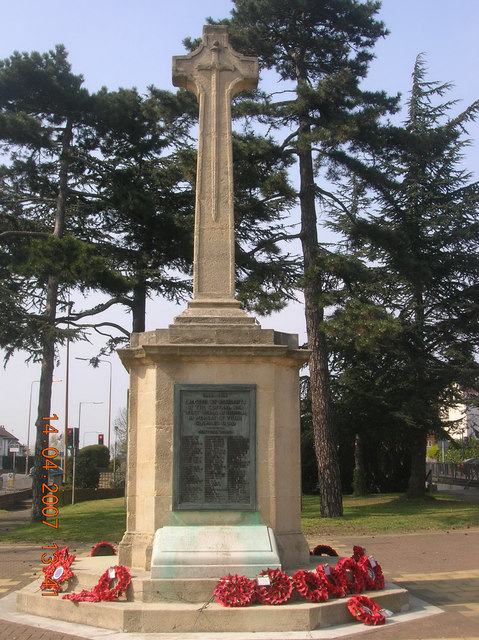
Hendon War Memorial on Watford Way

Hendon Town Hall was built in 1900 from designs by T. H. Watson.

Hendon's first proper fire station (1914) was built to designs by A. Welch, and superseded another close by in Church End. Next to the town hall is Hendon Library, built in 1929 to designs by T. M. Wilson. It was considerably rebuilt internally during 1972–3 and 2003–4. Eileen Colwell, the pioneer children's librarian, worked for many years at Hendon from the 1930s.

Between 1937 and 1939, the Middlesex County Council built 'Hendon Technical Institute' (designed by (H. W. Burchett), which became 'Hendon College', then in 1973 an Institute of technology called 'Hendon Polytechnic', and it is now part of Middlesex University.

Hendon War Memorial was unveiled on St George's Day, 23 April 1922, and was moved to its present location in 1962.

=== West Hendon and the Hyde ===
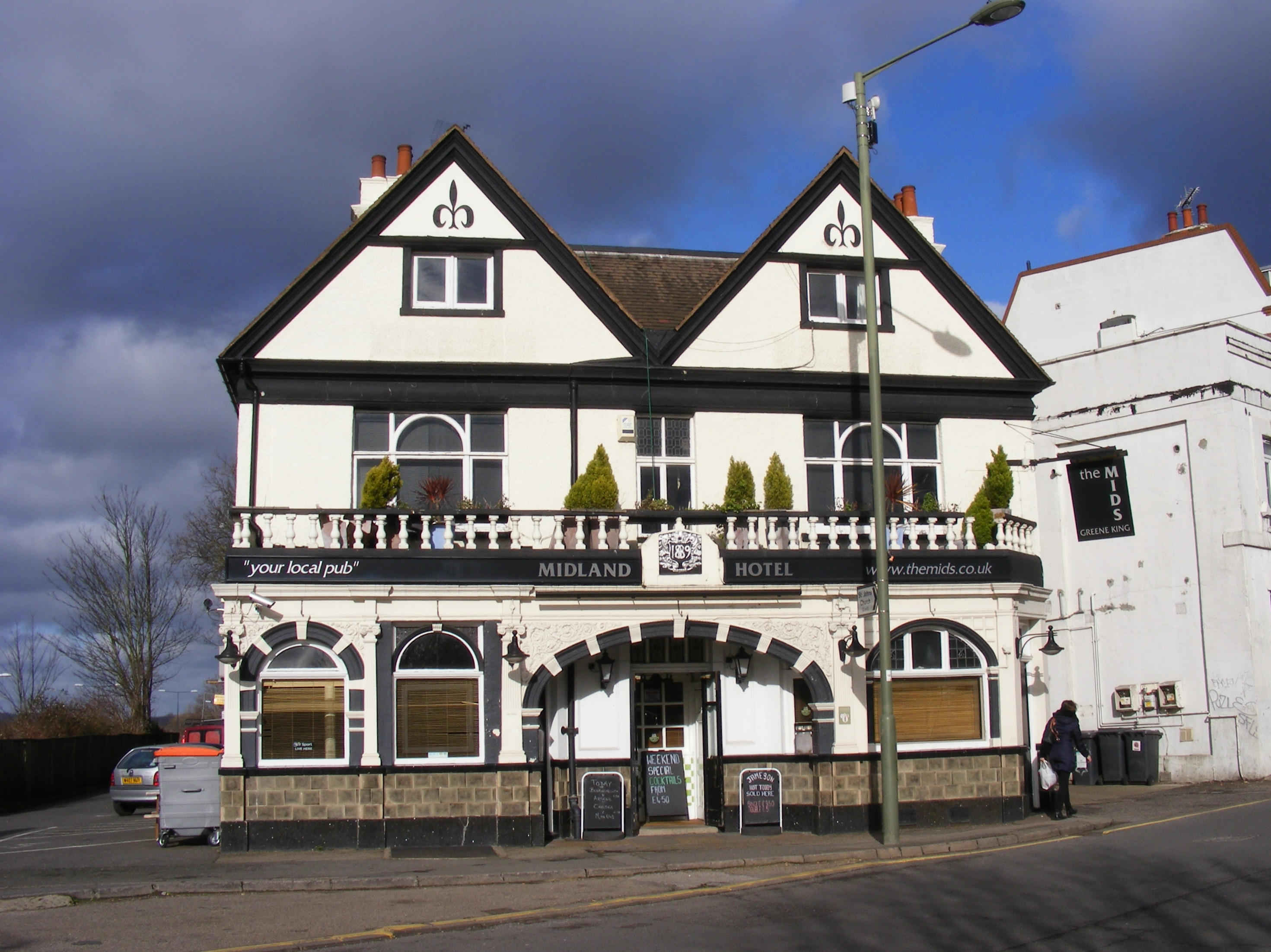
Midland Hotel (built 1889) by Hendon station, West Hendon

West Hendon Broadway is part of the arterial A5 road (or Edgware Road), which was Watling Street during Roman Britain. In the 18th century two public houses named "Welsh Harp" were built, giving the popular nickname of the nearby Brent Reservoir. Hendon railway station was opened in 1868 soon followed by Welsh Harp railway station, by the Midland Railway.

This new district developed around the A5 and Hendon rail station became known as New Hendon by the 1880s. West Hendon Broadway was served by the Metropolitan Electric Tramways from 1904, which ran from Cricklewood to Edgware on the A5 and later extended northwards to Canons Park and southwards to Acton. Eventually the area formed a popular retail district during this time. West Hendon was devastated by a Luftwaffe bomb in 1941.

To the north, the Hyde was the site of Hendon's courthouse opening in 1913 and an open-air swimming pool build by 1922. In 1925 Duple Coachbuilders opened a factory here and were one of the largest employers in Hendon with 800 workers. The coachbuilders even named one of its products "Hendonian". This factory closed in 1970.

=== Parson Street and Holders Hill ===
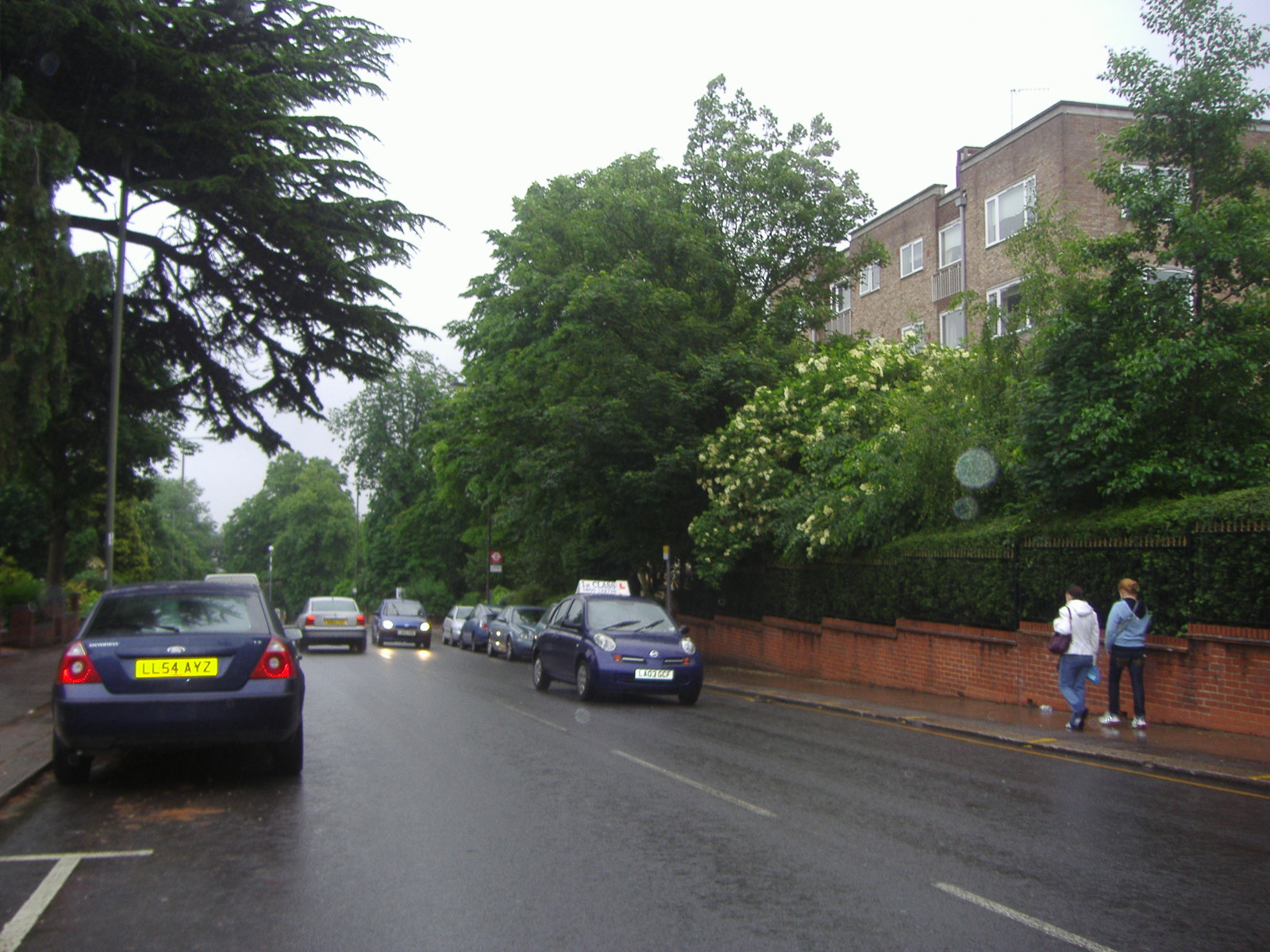
Parson Street

During the 18th century, some of the immediate estate surrounding Hendon Place was auctioned off for large houses, with much of the land being used for building other mansions. Of these, Hendon Hall (later a hotel owned by Hand Picked Hotels but now demolished), built in 1756 at the corner of Ashley Lane, was the last remaining and perhaps the best known. The suggestion that David Garrick, the actor, lived here while he was lord of the manor (1765–1779) is without foundation. A small obelisk in the hotel garden dedicated to William Shakespeare and David Garrick originally stood in Manor Hall Road until 1957. A ceiling painting by Tiepolo, Olympia and the Four Continents, was uncovered in 1954, and is now in the Met; but two other large ceiling paintings are still in the house.

A Mr. Somerville laid out Waverley Grove and Tenterden Grove in the 1860s, and by the end of the 19th century the estate saw further development by C.F. Hancock, including houses. On Parson Street, St Swithans was for many years a convent and training house of the Sisters of Nazareth. It is now a Jewish School. Further north is Holders Hill House, now Hasmonean High School.

=== Hendon Central ===
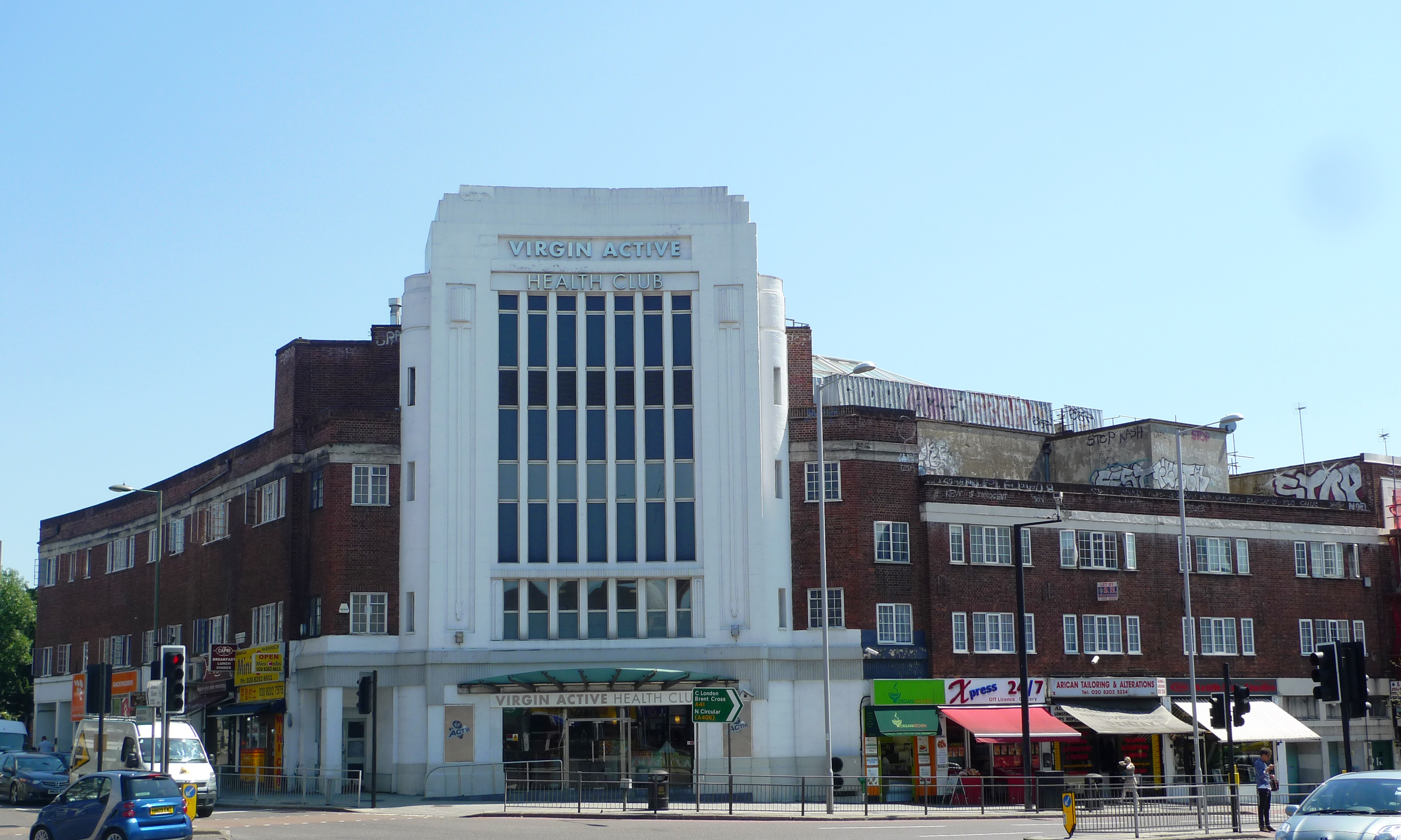
A former cinema, now a gymnasium run by Nuffield Health, at the Hendon Central crossroads

This busy area around a major road junction contains parades of shops and Hendon Central Underground station. Before the coming of the Underground the area was just open fields. The station opened in 1923, built at the junction of the new Watford Way and a road from Brent Street to the Midland Railway station at West Hendon. A large roundabout was built in front of the station and shops and offices were built. London Electric railways referred to it as the Piccadilly Circus of North West London. During 1923, 687 houses, etc. had been built and plans for a further 1,500 had been passed. Thus the district developed, and the area around the station became an important shopping centre for Hendon.

=== Brent Street and Brent Green ===
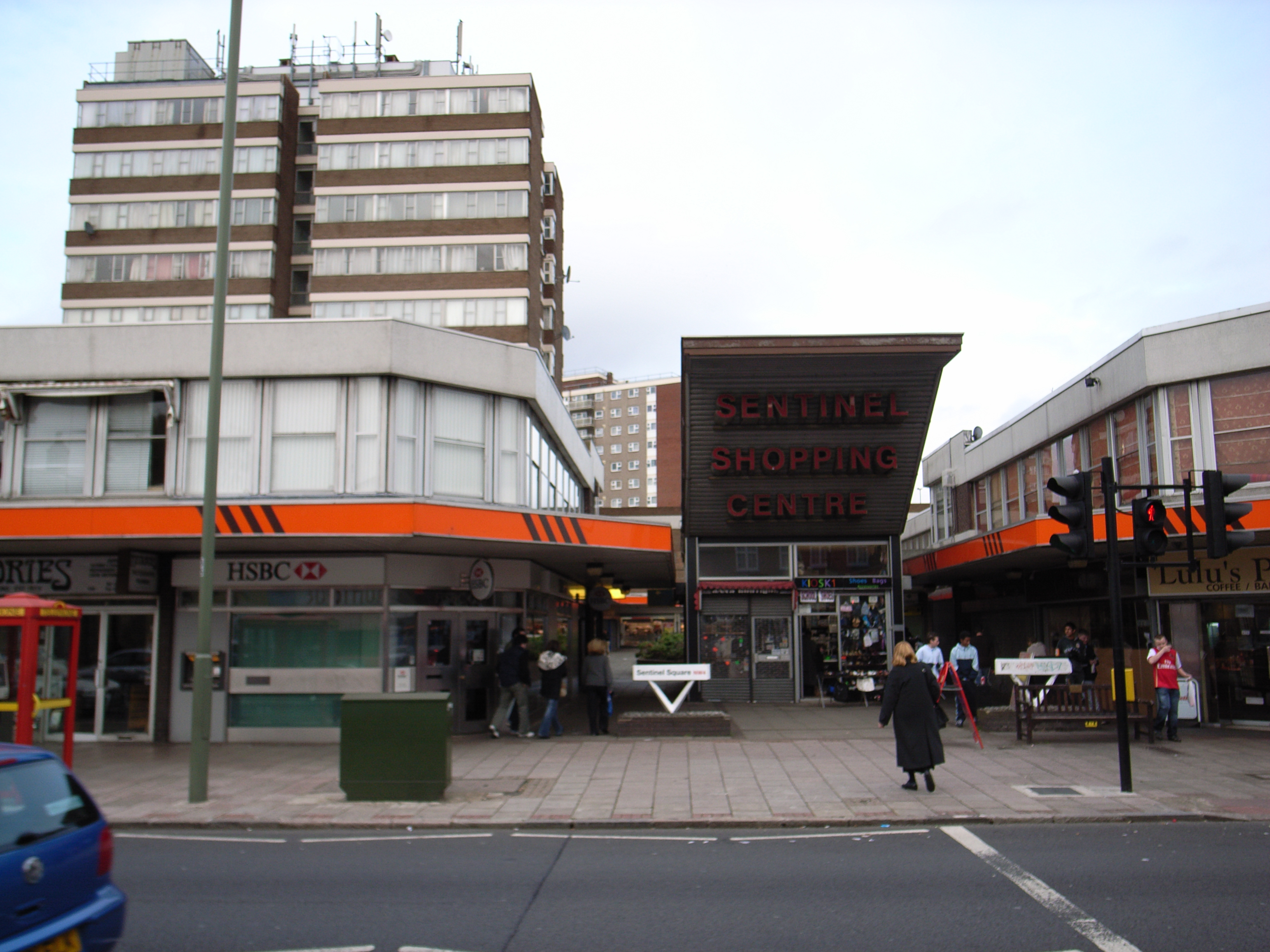
Sentinel Shopping Centre, Brent Street

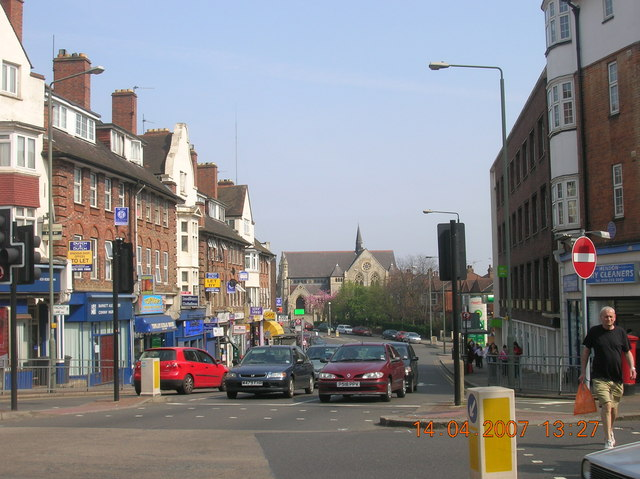
Finchley Lane junction with Brent Street

Brent Street was part of a northern route out of London, and at the Quadrant a seven-mile stone – the last piece of physical evidence for the road – is set into a wall. Much of the original small hamlet in Brent Street, which had been there since at least 1613, burned down in a fire in 1861.

Brent Street had a parish pump, which was in disrepair in 1818 owing to the numerous thirsty travellers using the road, and from 1796 there was a cage for criminals (removed in 1883), which stood at the junction of Brent Street and Bell Lane and is now commemorated by a blue plaque. By the 1850s there were at least 13 shops in Brent Street.

Congregationalists built a chapel (1855) and a school in New Brent Street (1856), which later moved and became Bell Lane Board School (1901). Tenby House is the last of three large properties that were built between Finchley Lane and Victoria Road. The Victoria Estate was developed around Victoria and Stratford Roads in the 1870s and 1880s. The cricketer and footballer Denis Compton was brought up here and lived in 47 Alexandra Road, attending Bell Lane Primary School. New Brent Street was the address of the local police office in 1855 (a later station, next to the Post Office at the corner of Brampton Grove and dating from 1884, was demolished in 2002). Christ Church was opened in October 1881 as a chapel of ease for St. Mary's, becoming a parish church in 1923.

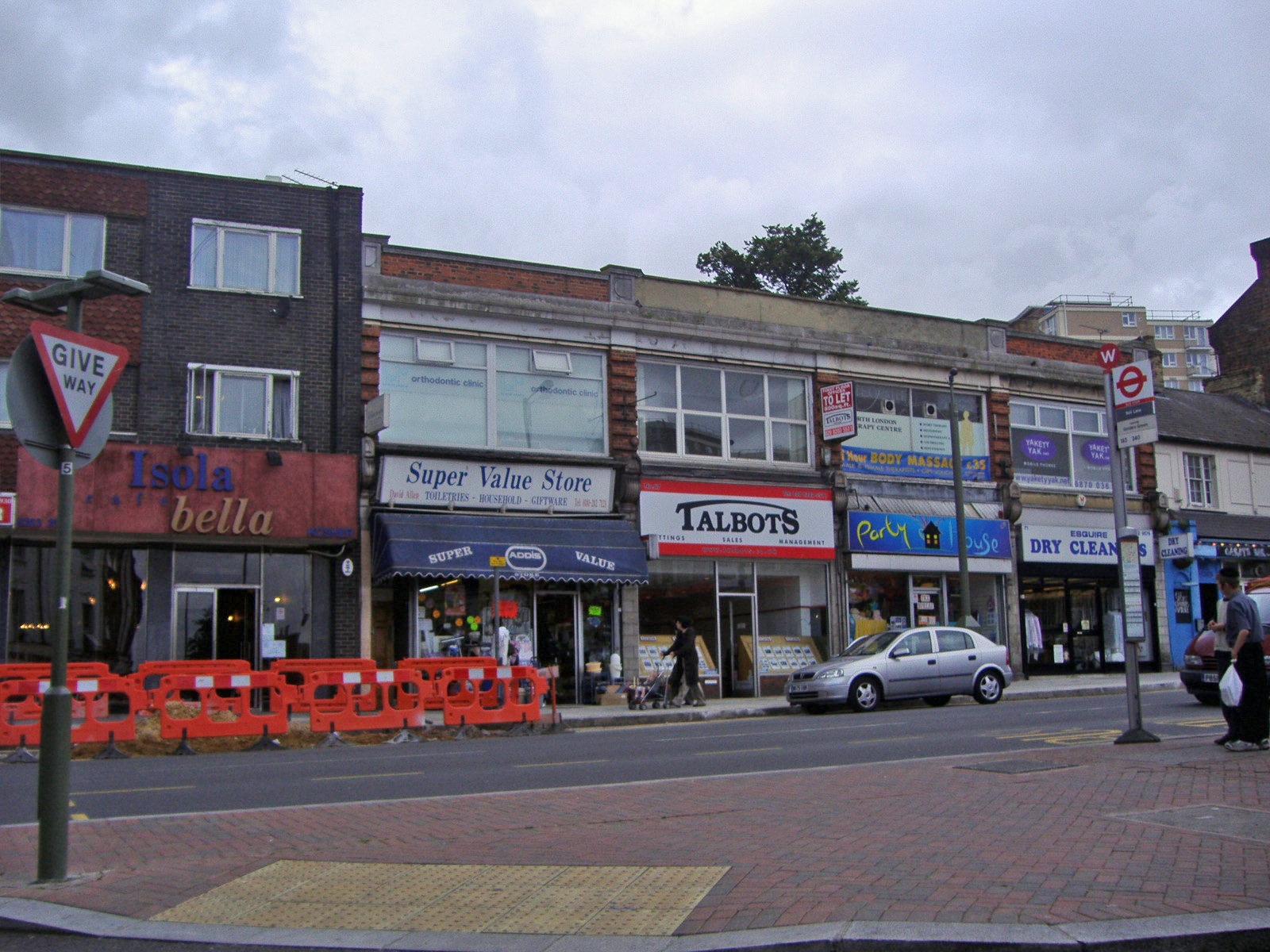
Shops on Brent Street

During the 20th century, a number of small factories were established in the area. The largest was Tilley Lamps Ltd (1915 to 1961), which employed around 300 people and manufactured pressure paraffin lamps (rather charmingly called Aladdin lamps in the 1930s). In December 1969, planning permission was granted for the development of a new shopping precinct on Brent Street to be called Sentinel Square, at a cost of £1.5 million, and within a year the old Rose and Crown pub, the Classic Cinema (once called the Gala), and a number of shops had been replaced with a collection of modernist shops and a Tesco supermarket. The Odeon at the Quadrant was opened in 1939 at what had been Cook's Corner in Parson Street. It was pulled down in 1979 and the site redeveloped for housing.

Salisbury Plain is a piece of wasteland in front of The Load of Hay (a pub demolished in 2004), where animals destined for Smithfield were penned overnight. There is a small collection of 18th-century houses along Shirehall Lane, two with fire plaques. Penfold House in Brent Street (not far from the site of The Load of Hay) is said to have been built in 1713. It is believed it had been a lodge for drovers bringing cattle up to London, and it was known as Albert Cottage until 1923.

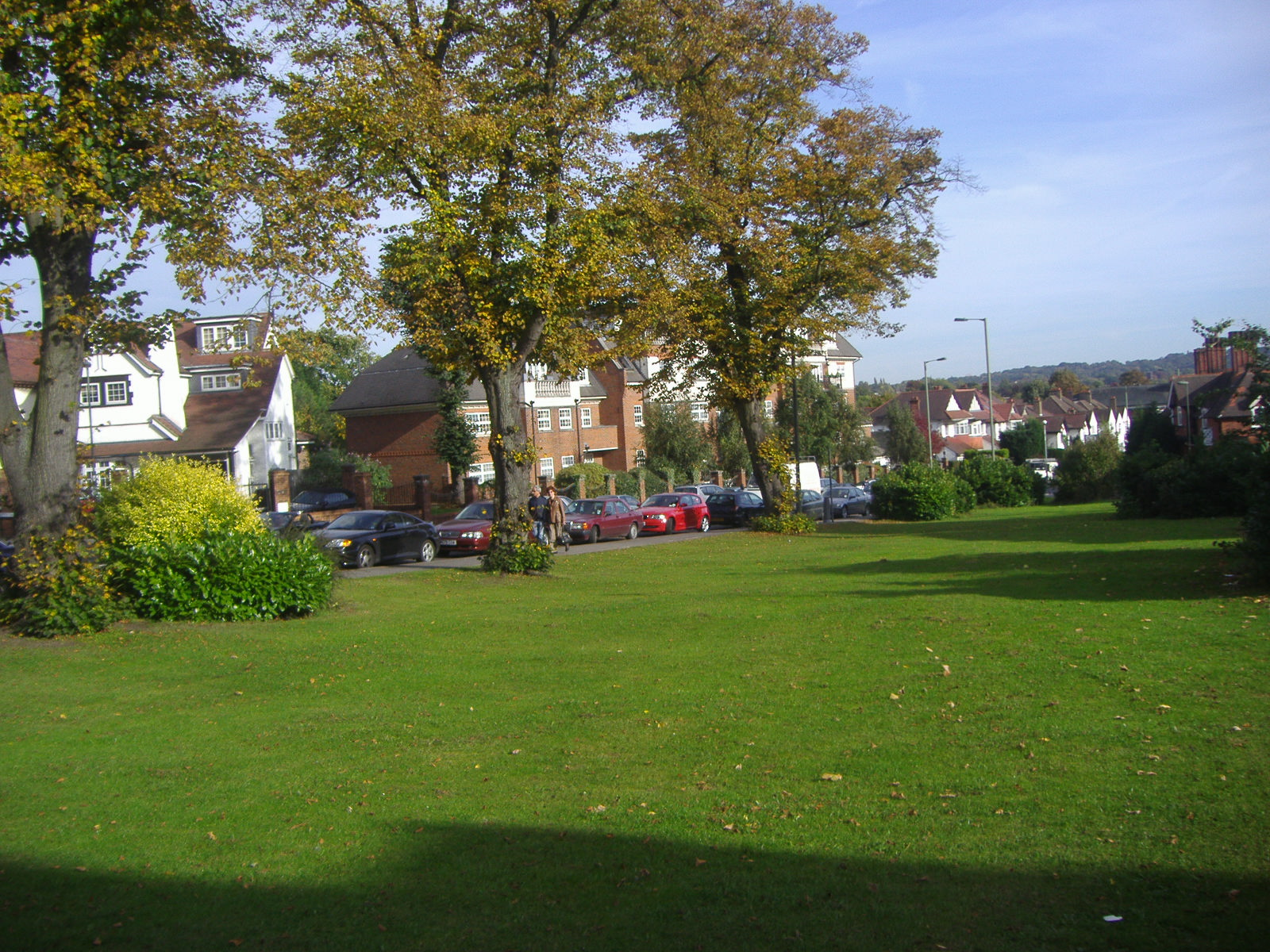
Brent Green

Near to Brent Green was Goodyers House (demolished in 1934), named after an important Hendon family. Where Goodyers House was is now a cul-de-sac called Goodyers Gardens with about 10 or 11 houses. Number 11 was the main house when Goodyers House was still standing. Hendon Park was laid out on Step Fields, part of the Goodyers House estate, and was opened as Queen's Park in 1903. In July 1940, there was a particularly large propaganda rally held in Hendon Park – "Rout the Rumour". Hendon House was home to John Norden, a 16th-century cartographer, but was demolished and replaced with Hendon School. Famous alumni include Peter Mandelson, Rabbi Lionel Blue, and author Ruth Prawer Jhabvala.

== Geography ==
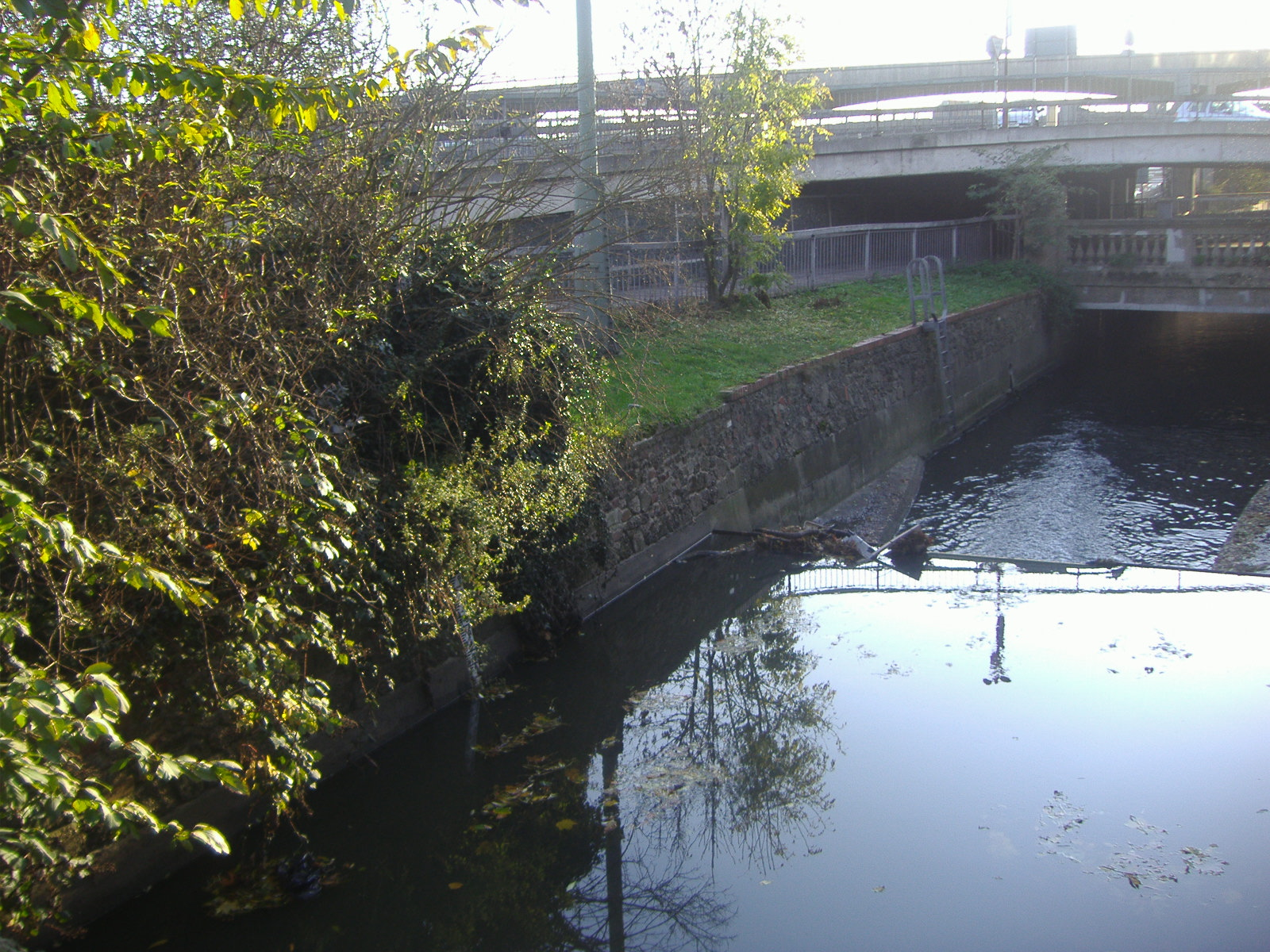
The River Brent in Hendon

Hendon peaks at an elevation of about 85 metres (279 ft) around Church End, with surrounding areas going downhill, often steeply.

The River Brent runs through Hendon. On 30 November 2009 the Environment Agency warned residents of flooding along the River Brent from Hendon to Brentford, after a day of notably heavy rain. Several premises were temporarily flooded in Brentford and Perivale.

There are two large public parks, Hendon Park in the south and Sunny Hill Park in the north; the latter is separated by the A41 trunk road from the Copthall complex and its adjacent fields.

== Demography ==
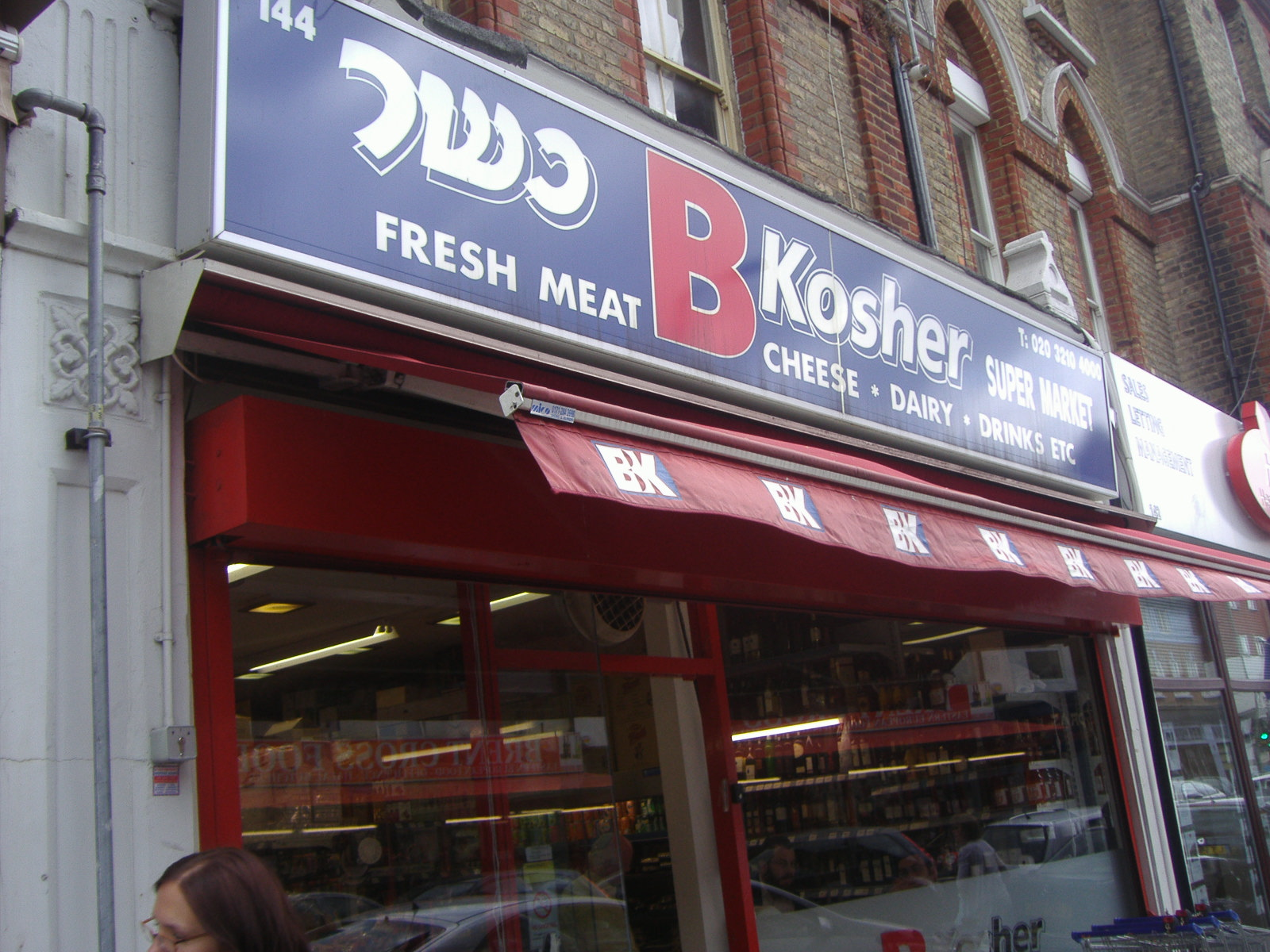
A kosher shop in Hendon

According to the 2011 census in Hendon ward, 60% of the population was white, with White British the largest group at 35%, followed by 25% Other White. 17% was Indian, 7% Black African, 5% Other Asian and 4% Chinese. Hendon has a high Jewish population. The West Hendon ward is more diverse with over half of the population being of minority ethnic heritage.

== Transport ==
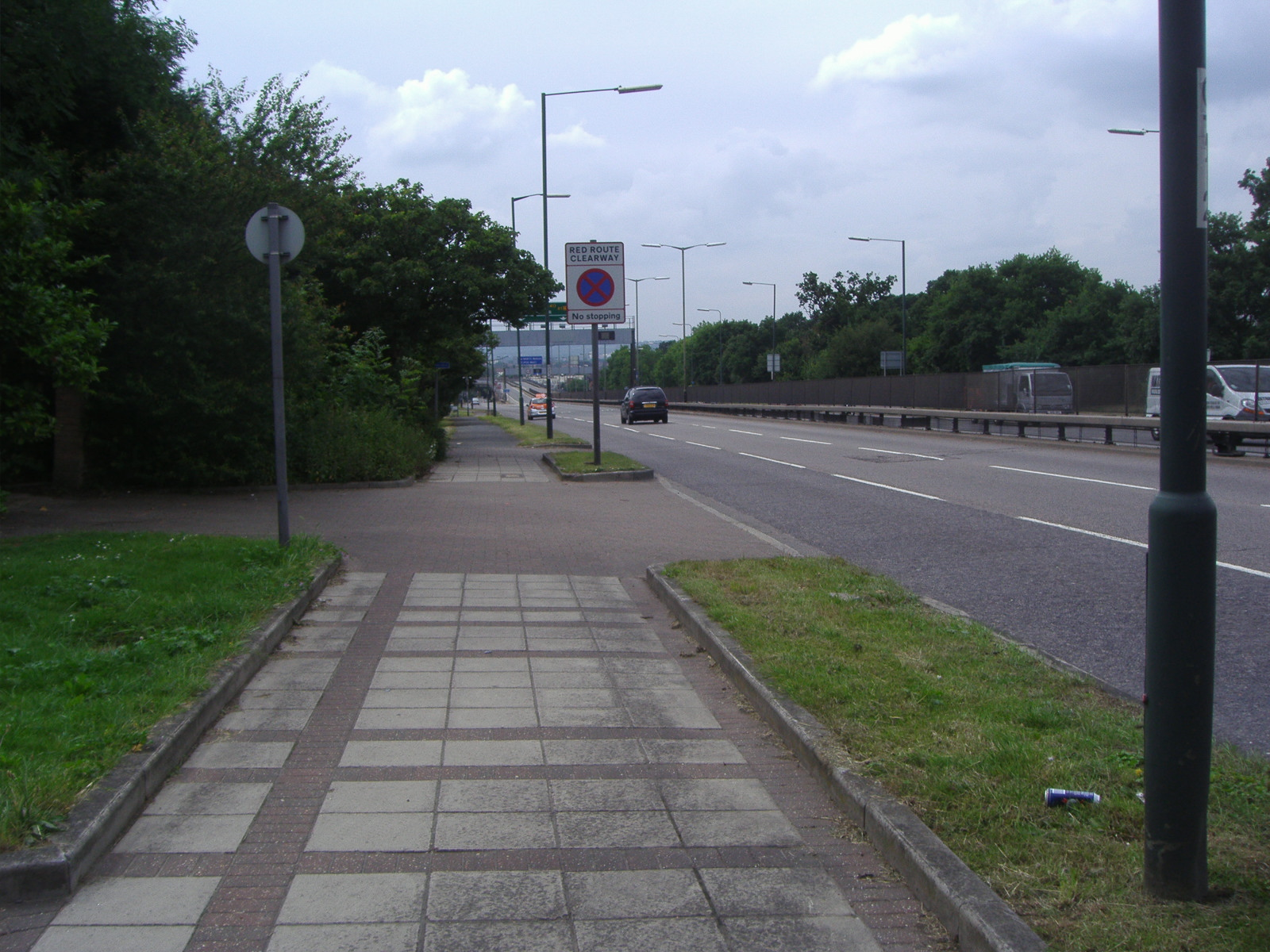
The A41 Watford Way in Hendon

Hendon is served by Hendon Central tube station on the Edgware Branch of the Northern line (Zone 3/4 on the London Underground network) and by Hendon railway station on National Rail's Thameslink service.

Numerous minicab companies operate within Hendon. The main routes that go through Hendon are the A1 (Great North Road); A41 (North Western Avenue), also at various stretches called Hendon Way and Watford Way as well as the A406 (North Circular Road); the last two have a junction that is called the Brent Cross flyover and is known as a traffic blackspot.

Further north is the site of Hendon Aerodrome in an area of Hendon now known as Colindale. It was famous for the first airmail delivery; the first parachute descent from a powered aircraft; the first night flights; and, from RAF Hendon during the Second World War the Royal Air Force provided the first aerial defence of a city. It is believed that the first casualty in the Battle of Britain was an RAF Hawker Hurricane pilot from Hendon. It closed to flying in 1968 and is now the site of the Royal Air Force Museum London, Hendon Police College as well as the housing developments at Grahame Park and Beaufort Park.

=== Buses ===
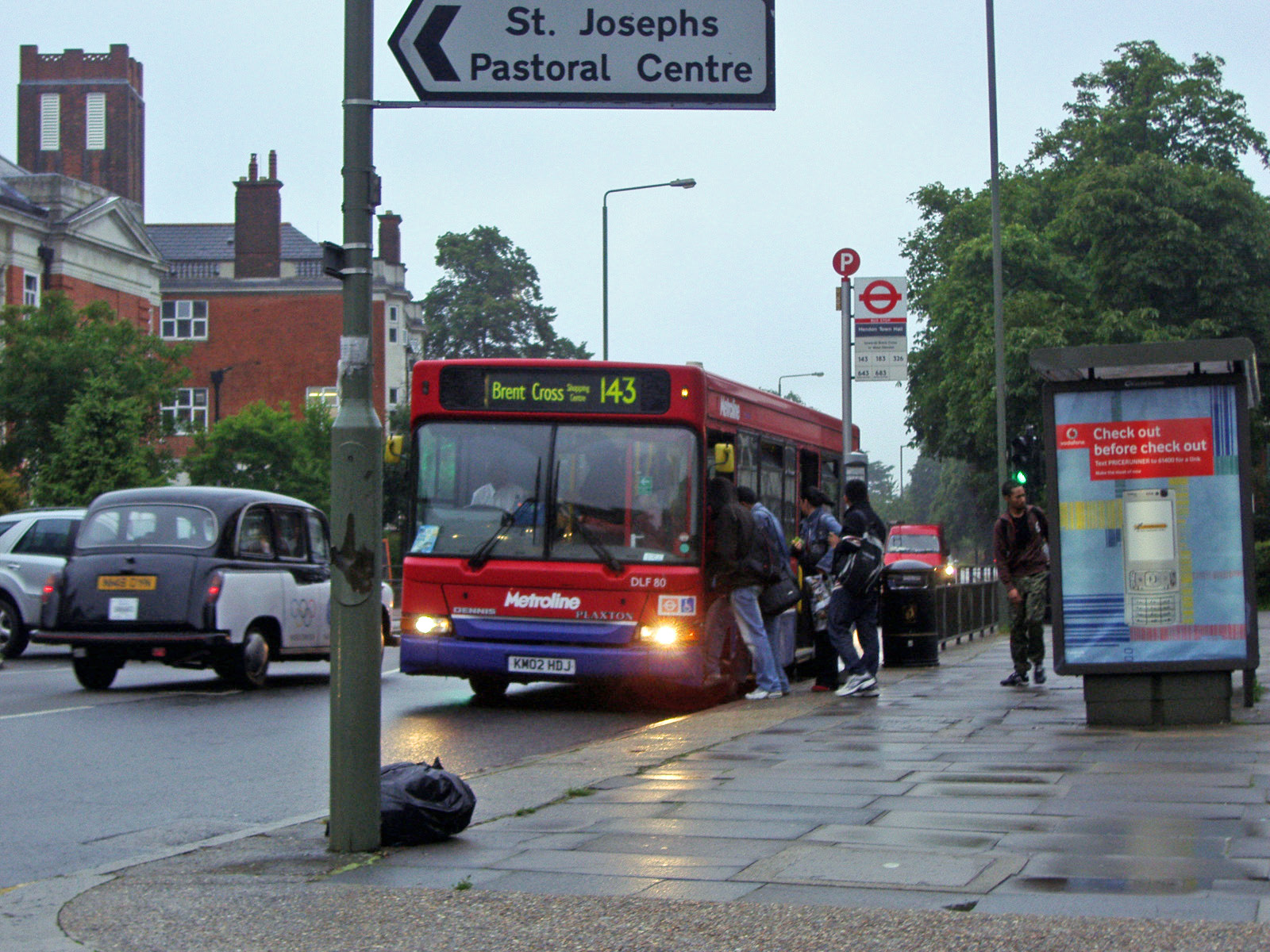
Bus 143 in The Burroughs, Hendon

Also, numerous bus routes link Brent Cross Shopping Centre to the West End of London and the new Wembley Stadium. Buses run as far south as Central London, as far east as Edmonton, as far west as Pinner and as far north as Watford Junction and Chipping Barnet. Bus routes are:

Brent Street: 83, 183, 240, N5, N83

Hendon Central Station: 83, 113, 143, 186, 324, 326, N5, N83, N113

The Burroughs: 125, 143, 183, 326

West Hendon Broadway: 32, 83, 142, 183, N5, N16, N83

Brent Cross Shopping Centre: 102, 112, 142, 143, 182, 186, 189, 210, 232, 266, 324, 326, C11

Holders Hill: 240

== Education ==
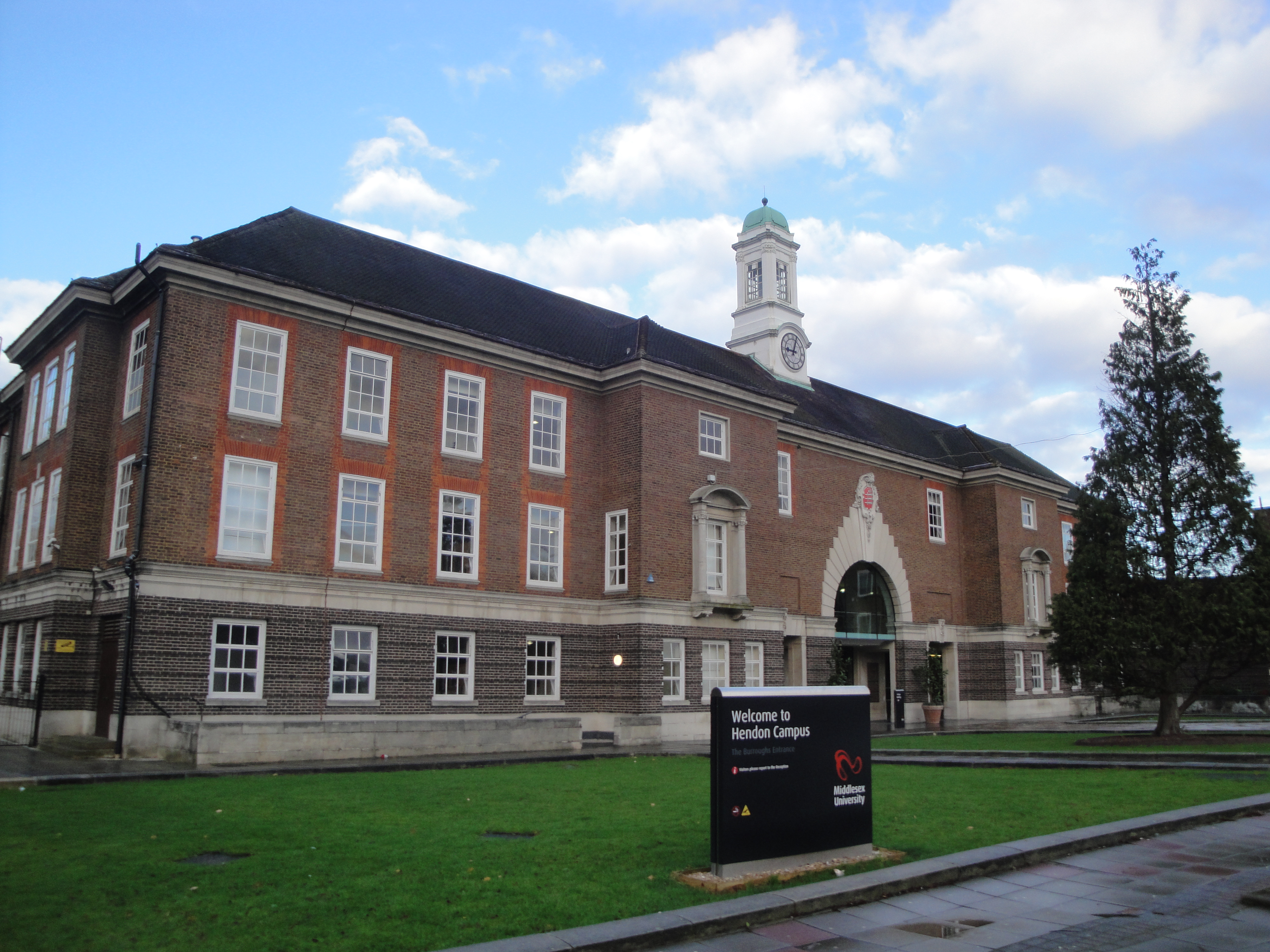
Middlesex University

Secondary schools in the area include Hendon School, Hasmonean School and St Mary's and St John's CE School. Brampton College is a private sixth form college located in the area. Hendon is also home to Middlesex University.

== Governance ==
Hendon constituency is represented by Labour's David Pinto-Duschinsky MP since 2024.

== Sports ==
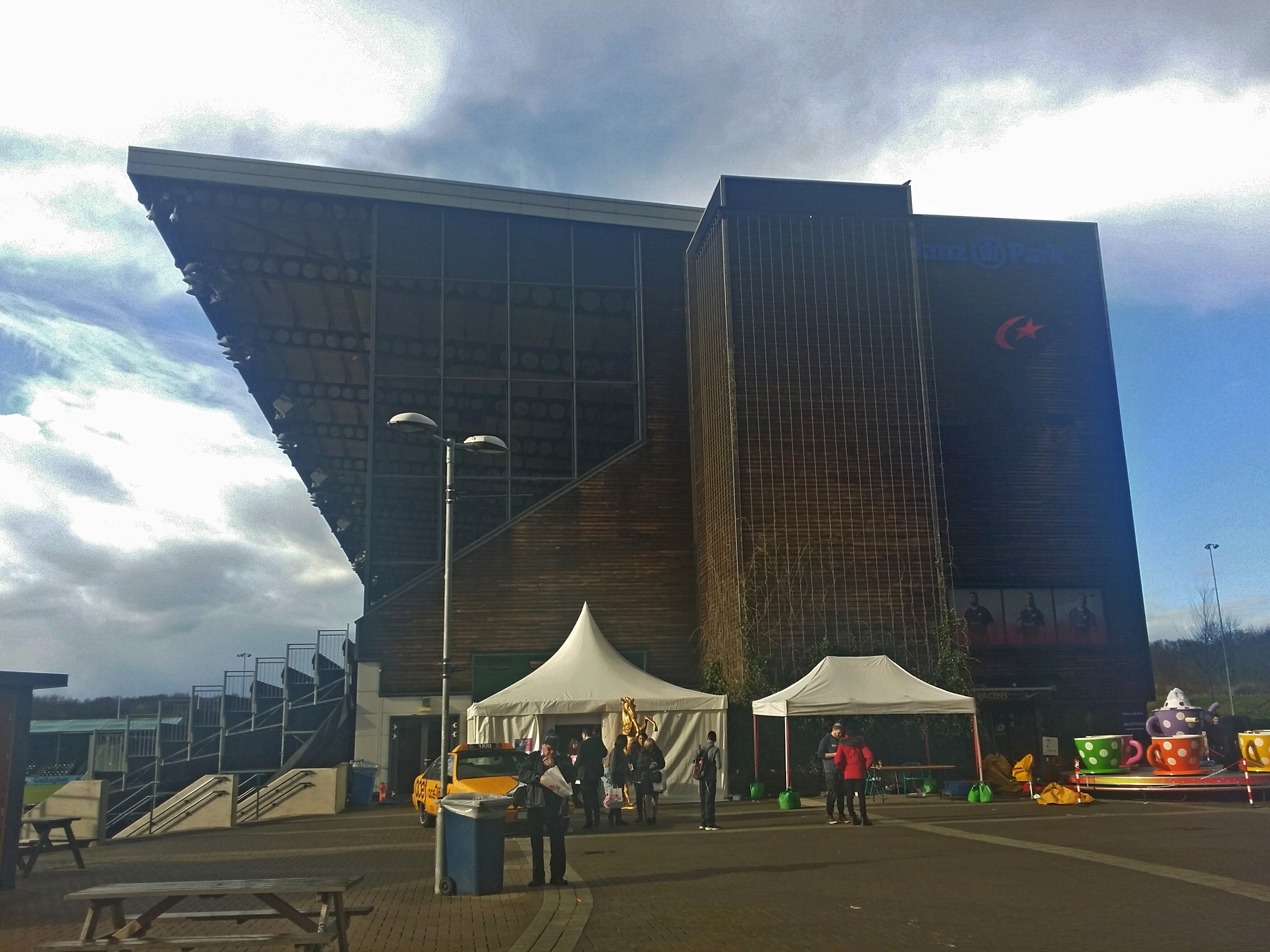
'Stone X' Stadium.

Hendon is the home of rugby union club Saracens, at Copthall Stadium. Based next door to Saracens is Hendon RFC, the local amateur rugby club. The local football club is Hendon F.C. and until recently there was a local athletics club. Hendon also has a golf club and a leisure centre. The local ladies' hockey club is Hendon & Mill Hill Hockey Club.

== Public services ==
Hendon is patrolled by the Metropolitan Police (the territorial police force in Greater London) and the Shomrim London North West Community Patrol. Colindale Police Station is located near Grahame Park Way. Nearby National Health Service hospitals are Edgware Community Hospital and Finchley Memorial Hospital. Hendon Magistrates Court is located on The Hyde.

== Notable people ==
- Alan A. Freeman – record producer
- Benjamin Pell – 'Benji the Binman'

== See also ==
- GN – car manufacturer
