= Church Farmhouse Museum =

Museum in London, England

Coordinates: 51.5913°N 0.2282°W

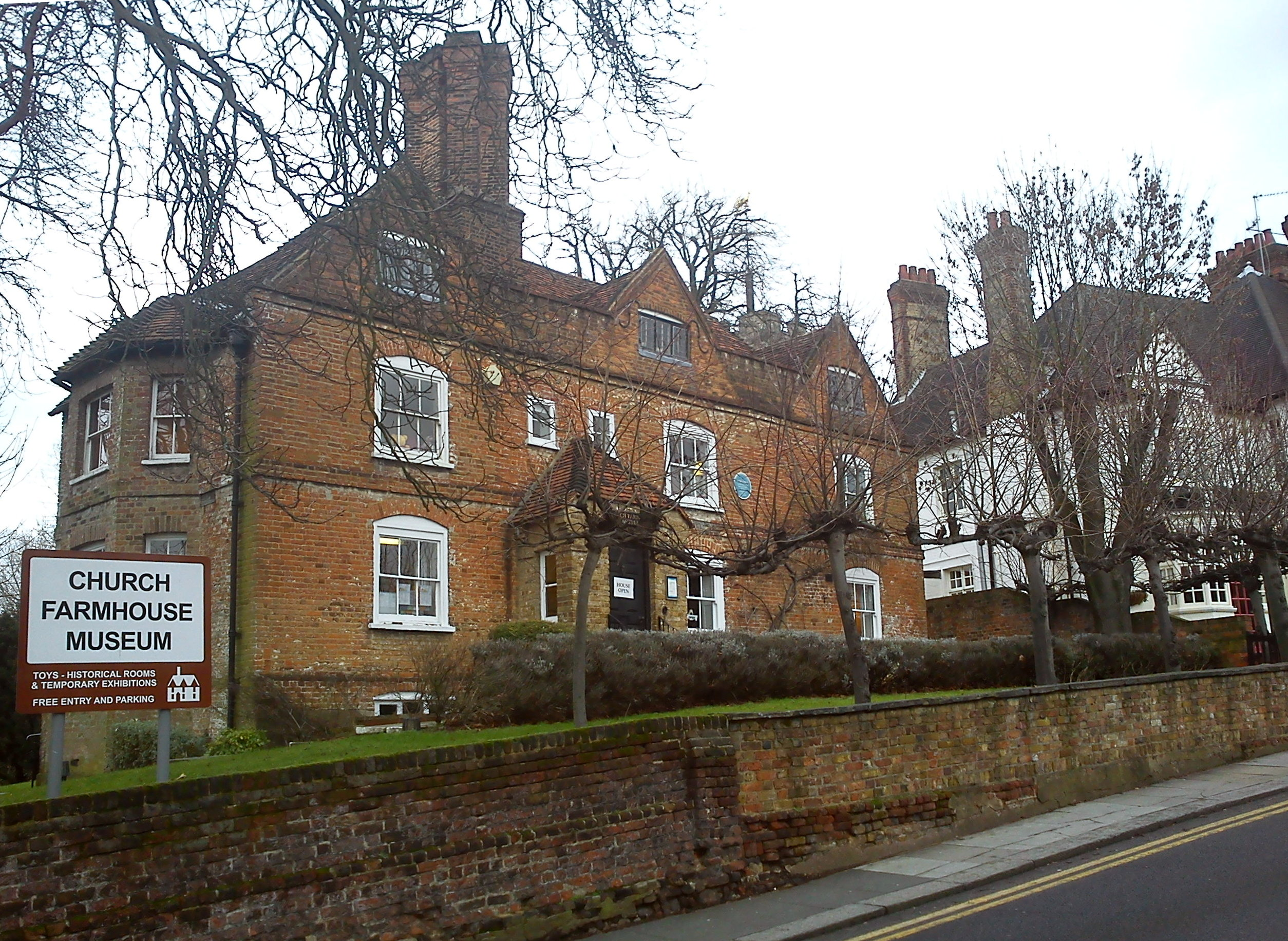
Church Farmhouse Museum from Greyhound Hill

Church Farmhouse Museum was in a Grade II* listed 17th-century farmhouse in Hendon, north London, in the London Borough of Barnet – the oldest surviving dwelling in Hendon.

The museum had two period rooms, a period kitchen and scullery, two exhibition spaces and a large garden with a pond. The building is a two-storey, red brick farmhouse with three gables and centrally placed chimney stacks. It is typical of 17th-century Middlesex vernacular architecture.

A blue plaque commemorates Mark Lemon, who lived in the house as a child between 1817 and 1823. His book Tom Moody’s Tales includes recollections of his childhood in the area. The house was owned by the Kempe family between 1688 and 1780, and later by the Dunlop family from 1869-1945.

Barnet Council, in an attempt to save money and despite local opposition, voted to withdraw funding from Church Farmhouse Museum, as well as Barnet Museum, from April 2011. The Council's cabinet met on Monday 13 December 2010 and approved the budget for 2010/2011 which included this proposal. There was a brief period of public consultation up to 17 January 2011, resulting in two petitions submitted against the closure, one signed by an estimated 1,900 people and one by an estimated 1,000 people. followed by a final recommendation by the cabinet in February, as a result of which the museum closed, for the time being, on 31 March 2011. The final temporary exhibition, "Harry Beck and the London Tube Map", closed on 27 March 2011.

Part of the museum collection went to Barnet Museum and part was sold at auction.

The building is now occupied by the Centre for Abuse and Trauma Studies and the European Human Rights Advocacy Centre, both part of Middlesex University. The University took over and restored the building in 2016.
