= Heylyn =

Heylyn or Heilyn is a name of Brythonic origin meaning cup-bearer. Characters bearing the name occur in stories found in the Red Book of Hergest and other collections of Welsh history and legend.

The Heylyn family came from Pentreheylin in the parish of Llandysilio Montgomeryshire. The family were hereditary cupbearers to the Princes of Powys, and a pedigree dates back to around 1000 AD. Grono ap Heylyn was commissioned by Llewelyn the Last in peace negotiations with Edward I of England.

Heylyn or Heylin as a surname may refer to:

- Edward Heylyn (1695–1765), English merchant and entrepreneur, one of the founders of the Bow porcelain factory
- John Heylyn (1685–1759), Anglican divine, known as the Mystic Doctor
- Peter Heylin (1599–1662), English ecclesiastic and author of polemical, historical, political and theological tracts
- Rowland Heylyn (1563–1631) London merchant and publisher of a Welsh bible
