= Thomas Frye =

English painter (c.1710–1762)

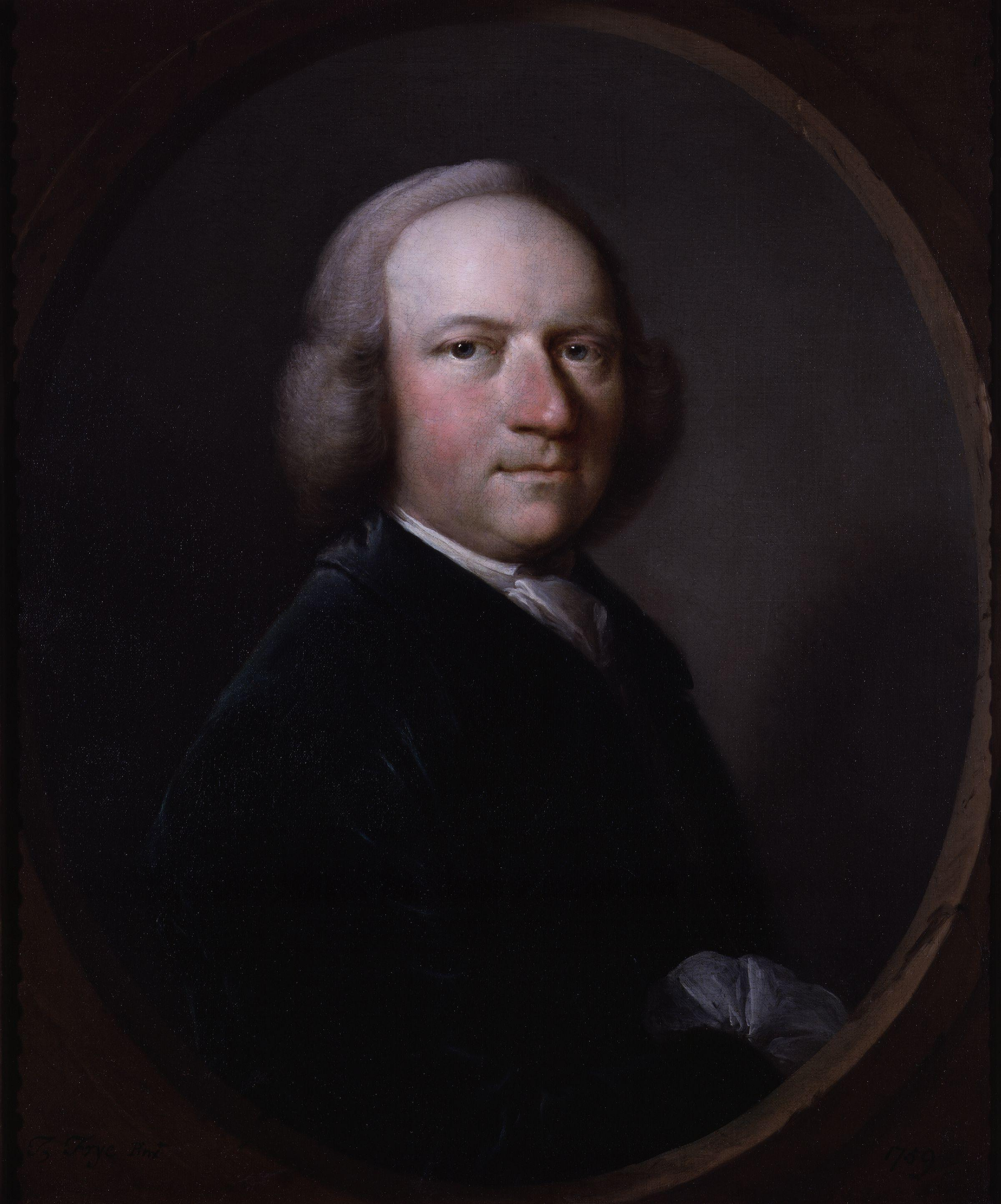
Thomas Frye, 1710–62, Thomas Frye, Dated 1759, Oil on canvas, feigned oval, National Portrait Gallery, London Primary Collection NPG 5471 National Portrait Gallery, London

Thomas Frye (c. 1710 – 3 April 1762) was an Anglo-Irish artist, best known for his portraits in oil and pastel, including some miniatures and his early mezzotint engravings. He was also the patentee of the Bow porcelain factory, London, and claimed in his epitaph to be "the inventor and first manufacturer of porcelain in England," though his rivals at the Chelsea porcelain factory seem to have preceded him in bringing wares to market. The Bow porcelain works did not long survive Frye's death; their final auctions took place in May 1764.

Frye was born at Edenderry, County Offaly, Ireland, in 1710; in his youth he went to London to practice as an artist. His earliest works are a pair of pastel portraits of boys, one dated 1734 (Earl of Iveagh). For the Worshipful Company of Saddlers he painted a full-length portrait of Frederick, Prince of Wales (1736, destroyed 1940), which he engraved in mezzotint and published in 1741. With his silent partner, a London merchant Edward Heylyn, he took out a patent on kaolin to be imported from the English colony of Virginia in November 1745, and became manager of the Bow factory from its obscure beginnings in the 1740s. He retired to Wales in 1759 for the sake of his lungs, but soon returned to London and resumed his occupation as an engraver, publishing the series of life-size fancy portraits in mezzotint, by which he is most remembered. He died of consumption on 2 April 1762 and was buried at Hornsey.

Frye had five children; his two daughters assisted him in painting porcelain at Bow until their marriages. One of them, who married a Mr Willcox, was employed by Josiah Wedgwood at the Wedgwood Etruria works in painting figure-subjects from 1759 to 1776, the year of her death.

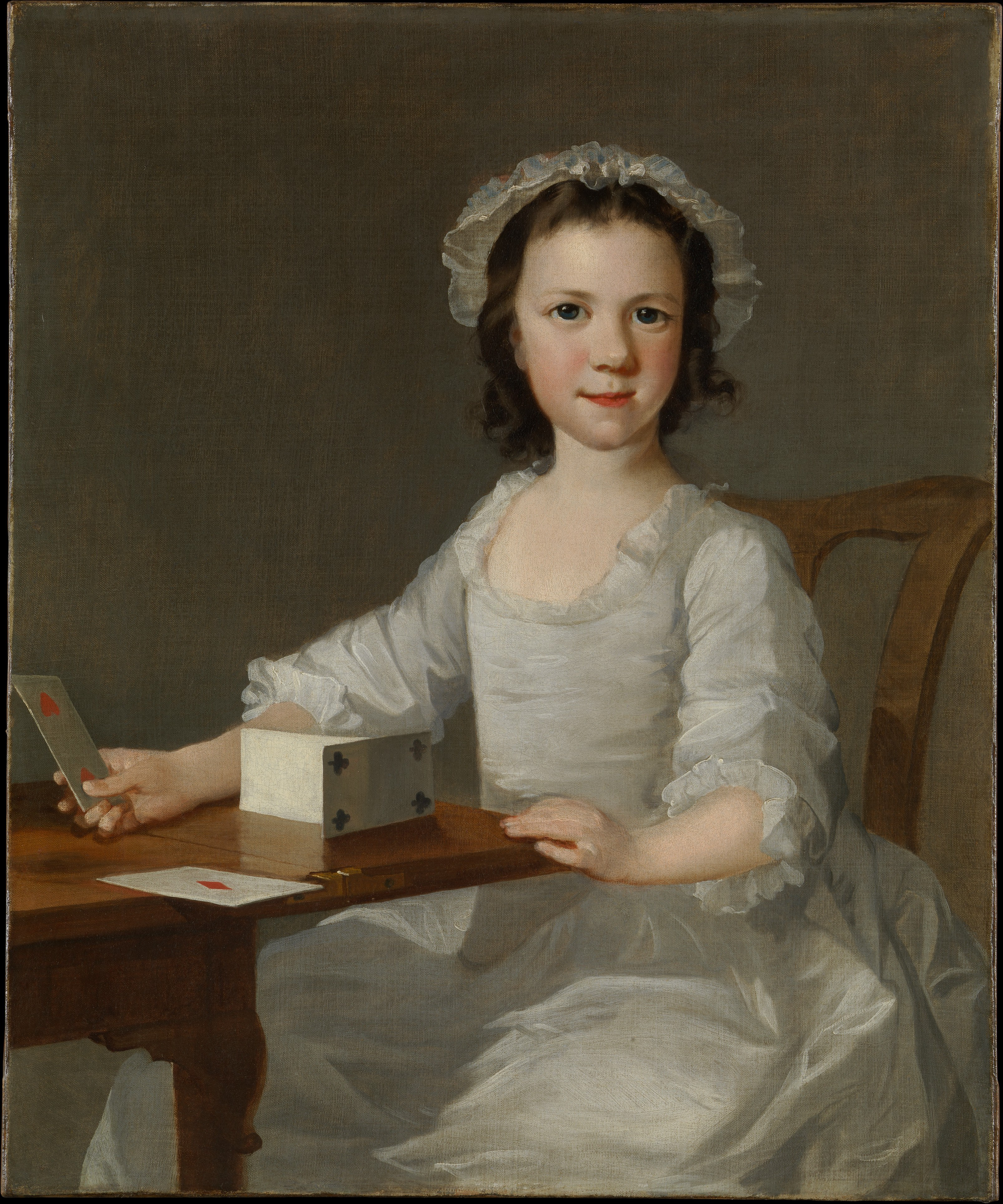
Girl Building a House of Cards Attributed to Thomas Frye

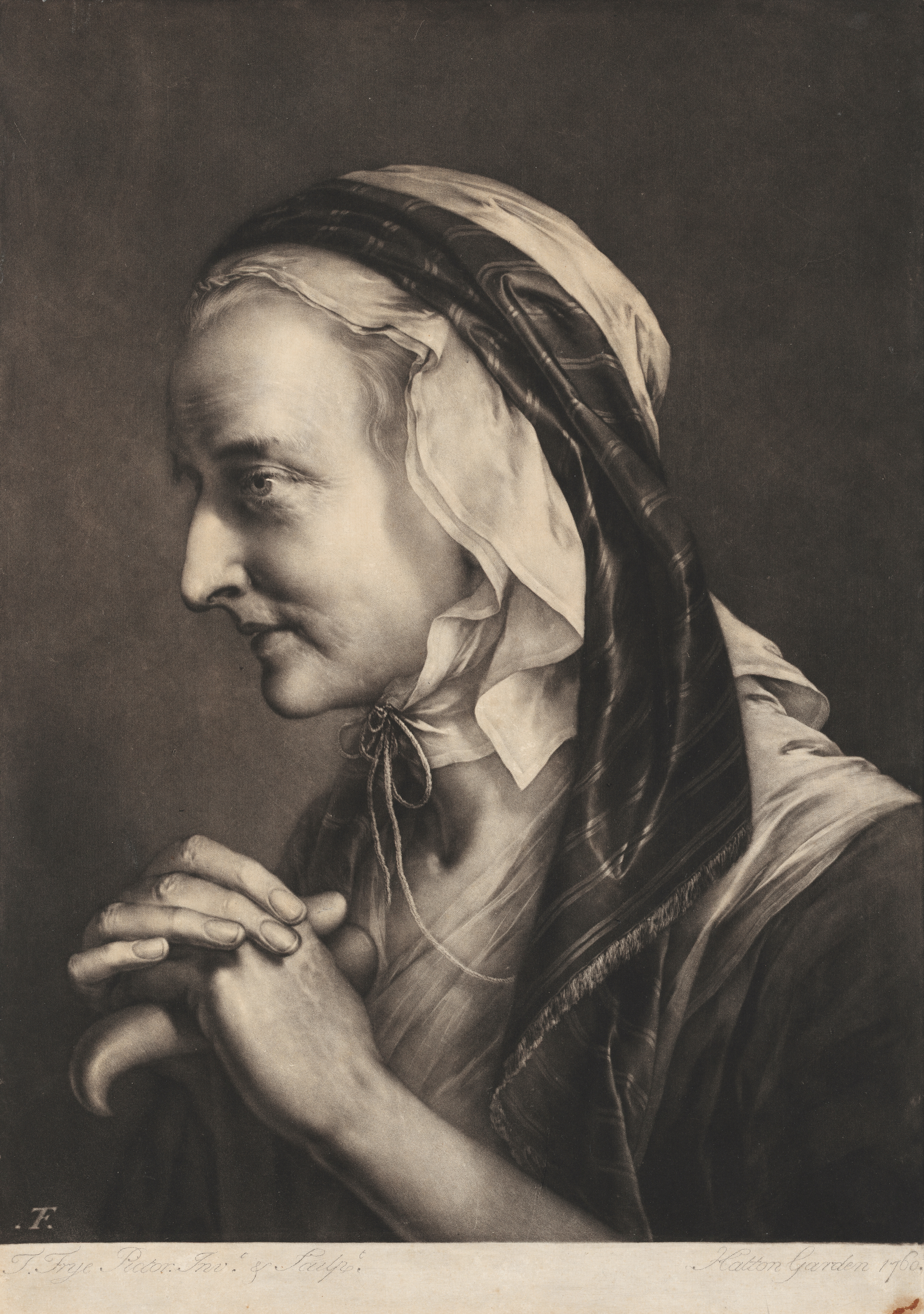
Old woman leaning on crutch. Mezzotint from the 'Twelve heads drawn from nature and as large of life' series. London, 1760. Chester Beatty Library

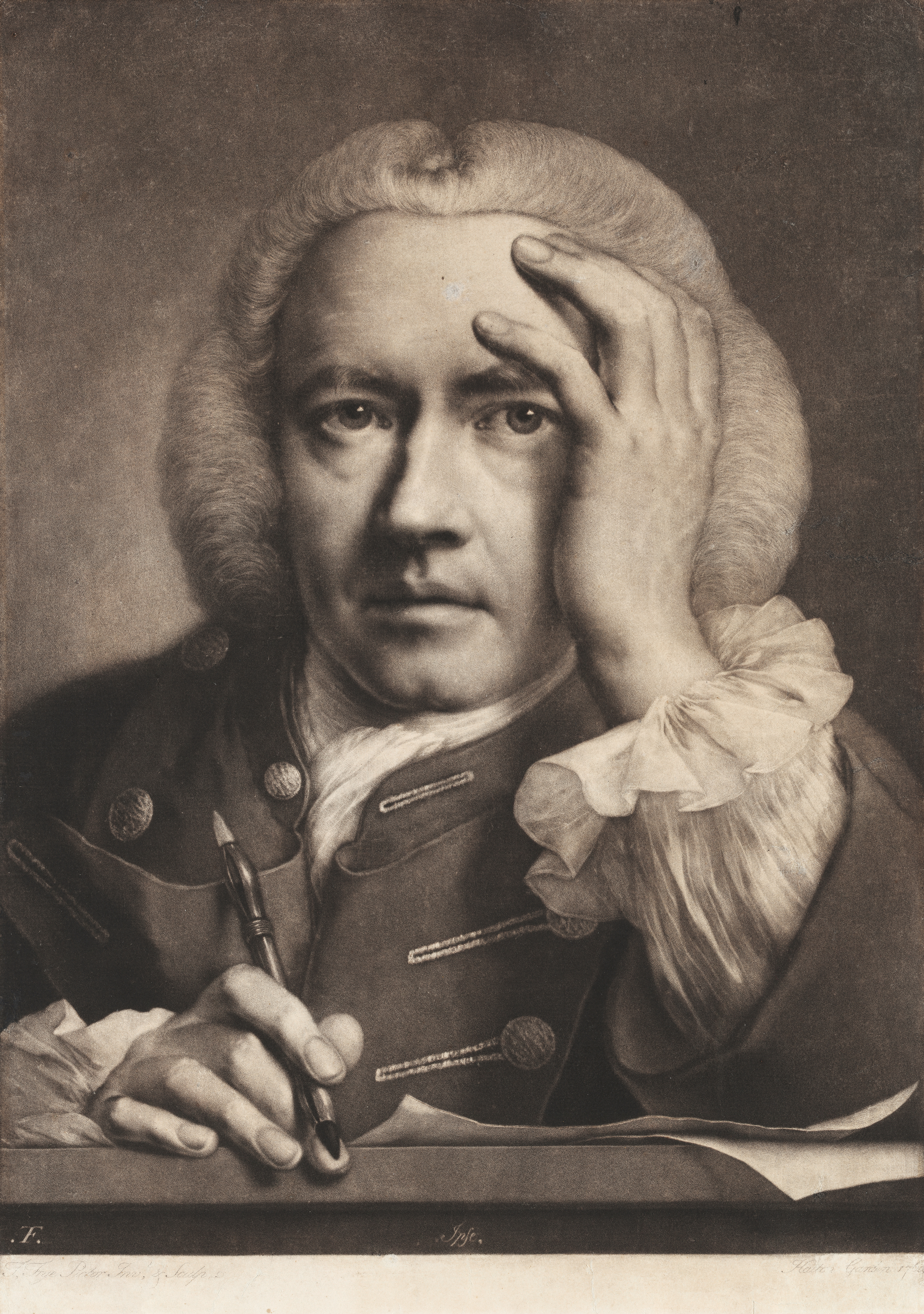
Self-portrait. Mezzotint from the 'Twelve heads drawn from nature and as large of life, series. London 1760. Chester Beatty Library

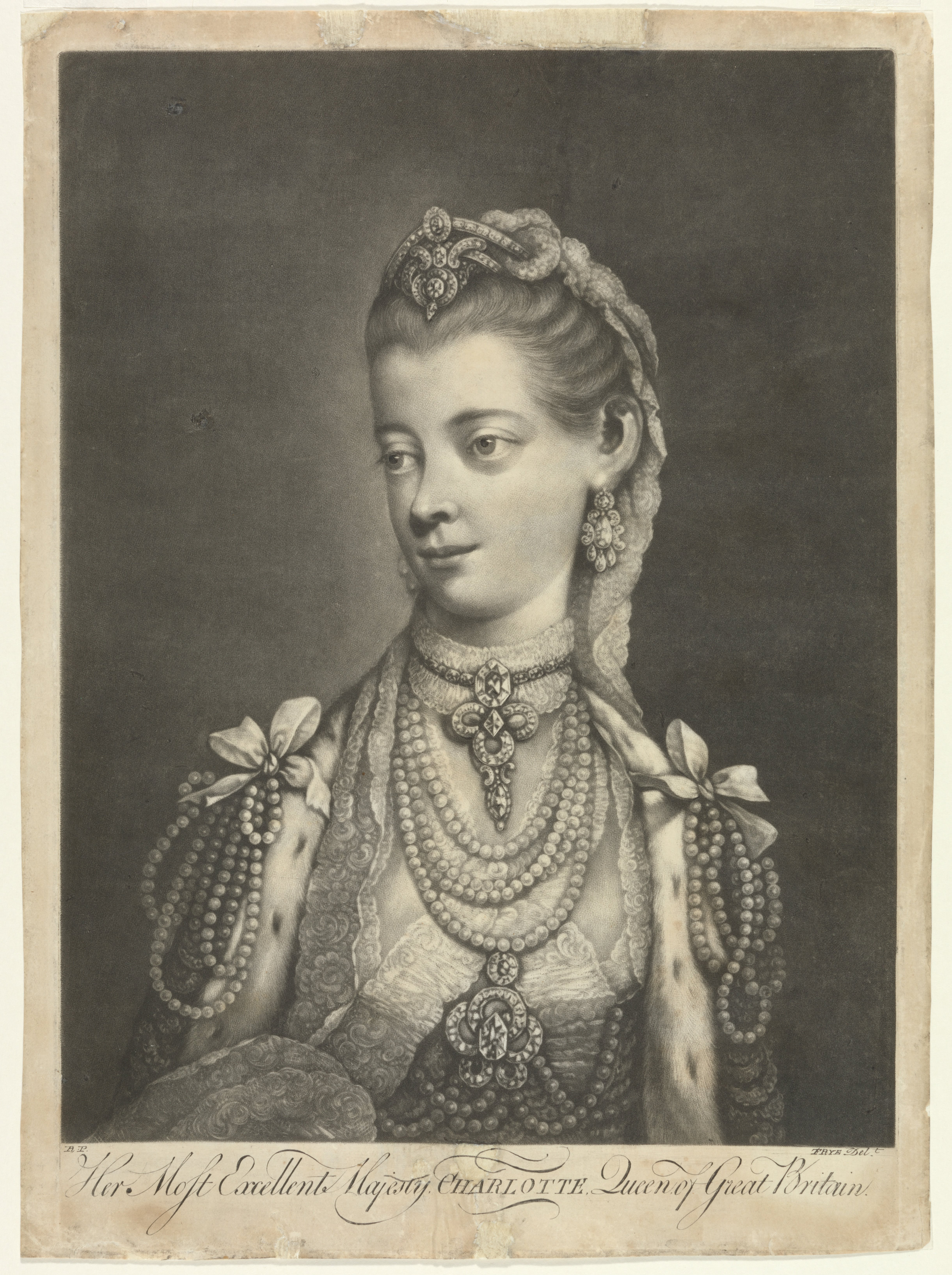
Her most excellent Majesty Charlotte, Queen of Great Britain. Mezzotint, London, 1762. Chester Beatty Library
