= St Mary le Strand =

Church in the City of Westminster, England

Coordinates: 51.512171°N 0.116904°W

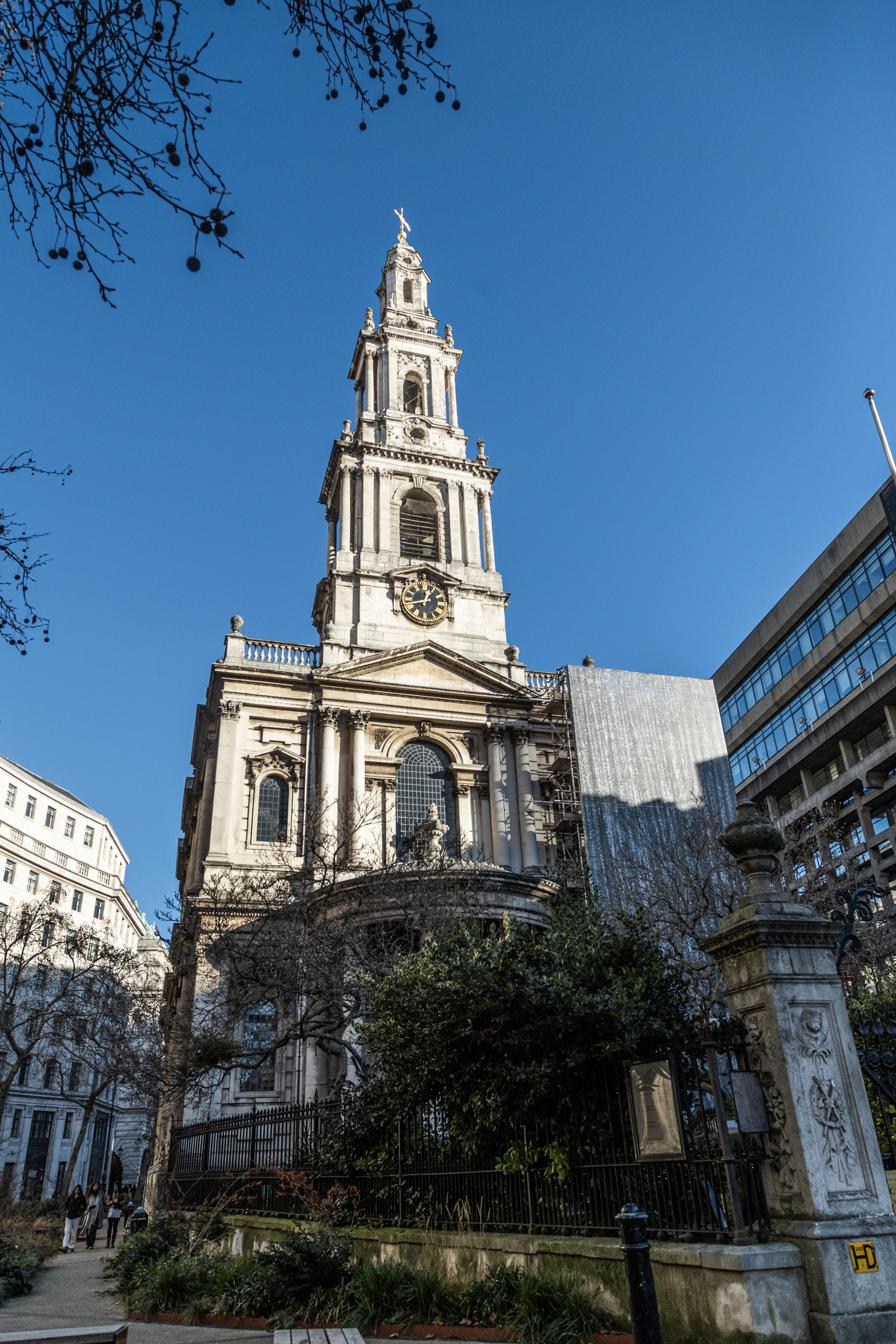
- St Mary le Strand seen from the West
- St Mary le Strand
- OS grid reference: TQ 30775 80933
- Location: Strand, City of Westminster, London
- Country: England
- Denomination: Church of England
- Churchmanship: Liberal Catholic
- Website: www.stmarylestrand.com

History
- Dedication: Virgin Mary
- Dedicated: 1724; 302 years ago

Architecture
- Heritage designation: Grade I
- Architect: James Gibbs
- Years built: 1714–1724

Administration
- Diocese: Diocese of London
- Archdeaconry: Archdeaconry of London (previously Charing Cross)

Clergy
- Vicar: Peter Babington

St Mary le Strand is a Church of England church at the eastern end of the Strand in the City of Westminster, London. It lies within the Deanery of Westminster (St Margaret) in the Diocese of London. The church stands on what was until 2021 a traffic island to the north of Somerset House, King's College London's Strand campus, and south of Bush House (the former headquarters of the BBC World Service which became part of King's College London). The foundation was part of an extensive new church building effort in the early 1700s (Queen Anne Churches). It is the official church of the Women's Royal Naval Service, and has a book of remembrance for members who have died in service. It is known as one of the two 'Island Churches', the other being St Clement Danes.

== History ==
The church is the second to have been called St Mary le Strand, the first having been situated a short distance to the south. It was mentioned in a judgment of 1222, when it was called the Church of the Innocents, or St Mary and the Innocents. It was pulled down in 1549 by Edward Seymour, 1st Duke of Somerset, to make way for Somerset House. The parishioners were promised a new church, which was never built, forcing them to move to the nearby church of St Clement Danes and afterwards to the Savoy Chapel. The site occupied by the modern church was formerly occupied by a great maypole, which had been the scene of May Day festivities in the 16th and 17th century and was severely decayed by the early 18th century.

The new St Mary le Strand was the first of the twelve new churches built in London under the Commission for Building Fifty New Churches, at a cost of some £16,000. Construction began in February 1714 under the architect James Gibbs, being his first major project following his return from Italy. The steeple was completed in September 1717, and the church was consecrated for use on 1 January 1724, by Edmund Gibson, Bishop of London, when John Heylyn became first rector of the rebuilt church. Bonnie Prince Charlie is said to have renounced his Roman Catholic faith in the church to become an Anglican during a secret visit to London in 1750. John Dickens and Elizabeth Barrow, the parents of Charles Dickens, were married here in 1809.

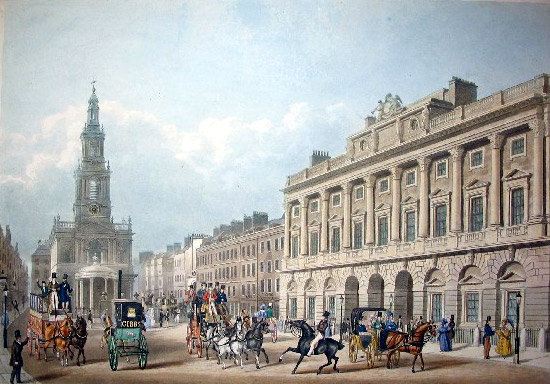
A 19th-century print showing St Mary le Strand at left, and the Strand front of Somerset House at right

It was restored in 1871 by Robert Jewell Withers, who removed the box pews and had them re-formed into the elegant benches with scrolling sides that one sees in the church today. The tiled floor in the nave and chancel are also his doing.

The Church Times said

RE-OPENING OF THE CHURCH OF ST MARY-LE-STRAND —This church, which has been closed for several months, undergoing extensive alterations and thorough restoration, was re-opened for Divine service on Sunday morning. The whole of the unsightly and inconvenient pews have been removed, and replaced by free and open seats. The chancel has been greatly improved, and the whole of the church has been re-decorated with exceeding taste. In fact, the renovated ceilings of the nave and chancel, together with the tastefully coloured walls of this beautiful church, are well worthy of an inspection by all true lovers of architecture, and reflect great credit, on the architect, Mr. R. J. Withers, of 51, Doughty street. The cost of these alterations has amounted to upwards of £1,000.

— Church Times, 26 May 1871, page 236

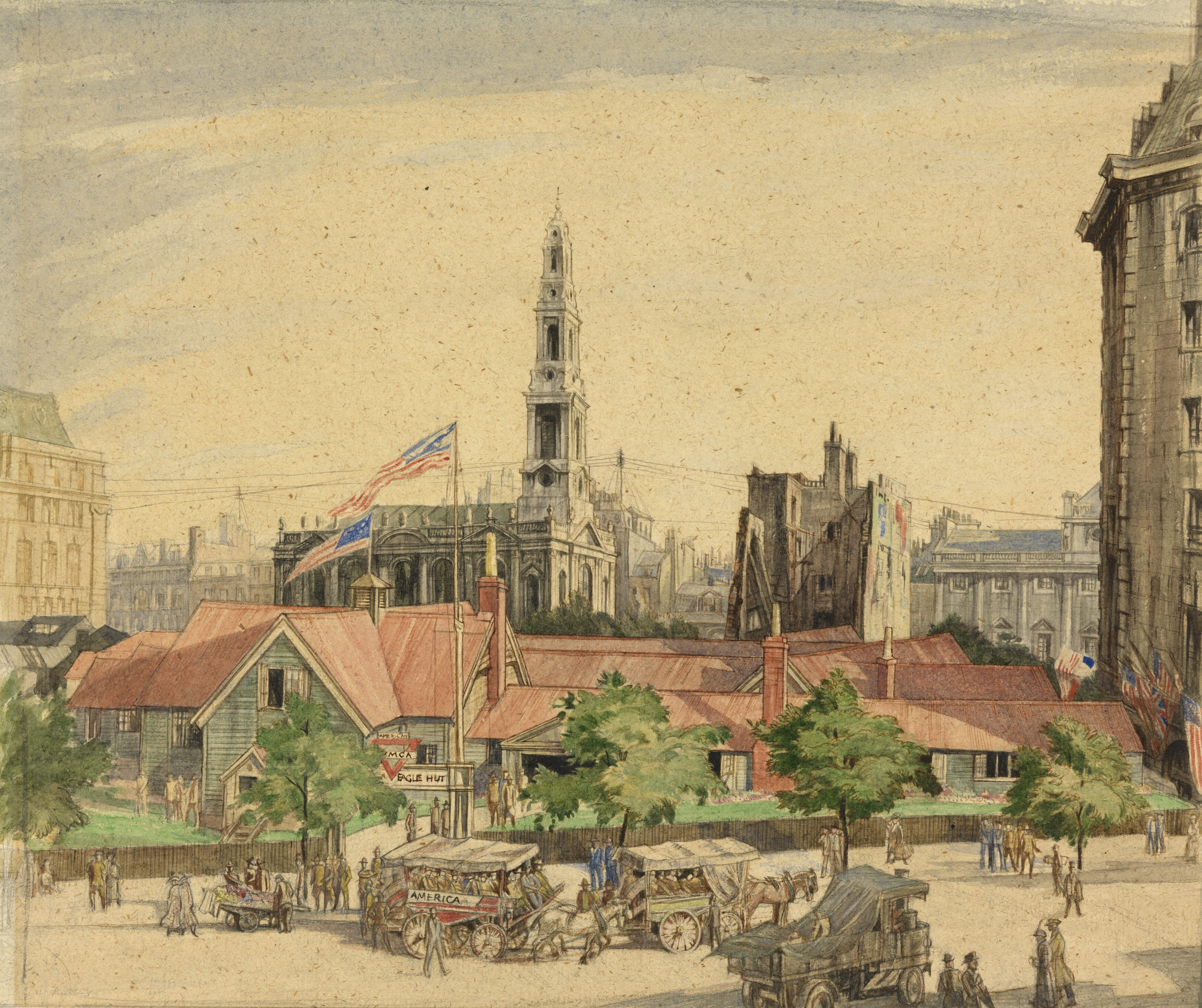
The church behind a YMCA camp c. 1918 by Henry Rushbury

At the start of the 20th century the London County Council proposed to demolish the church to widen the Strand. A campaign involving the artist Walter Crane preserved the church itself; the graveyard was obliterated and the graves moved to Brookwood Cemetery. During the London Blitz of the Second World War the church was damaged by a nearby bomb explosion.

== Architecture ==
The architecture of St Mary le Strand proved controversial from the outset, and the architect later expressed unhappiness at the way that his plans had been altered by the Commissioners. According to Gibbs, the church was originally intended to be an Italianate structure with a small campanile over the west end and no steeple. Instead of the latter, a column 250 feet (76 m) high surmounted with a statue of Queen Anne was to have been erected a short distance to the west of the church. A great quantity of stone was purchased and brought to the spot, but the plan was abandoned on the death of the queen in 1714. Instead, the architect was ordered to reuse the stone to build a steeple, which fundamentally altered the plan of the church. Gibbs explained:

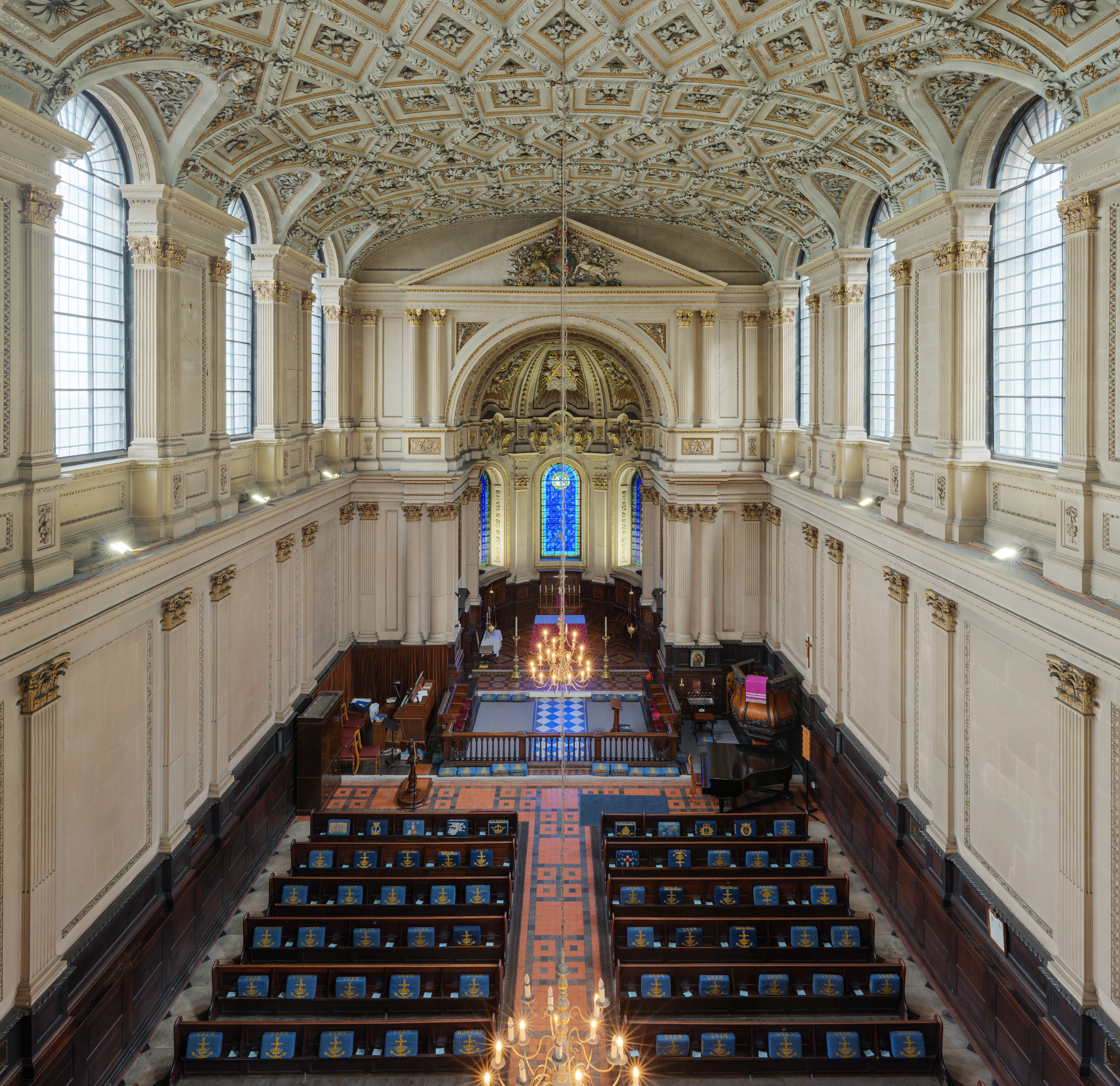
St Mary le Strand interior

The building being then advanced twenty feet above ground, and therefore admitting of no alteration from east to west, which was only fourteen feet, I was obliged to spread it from south to north, which makes the plan oblong, which should otherwise have been square.

The extravagant Baroque ornamentation of the exterior was criticised at the time, and matters were not helped when one of the decorative urns surmounting the exterior of the church fell off and killed a passer-by during a procession in 1802. The prominent situation of the church has also been problematic; even in the 18th century, parishioners complained of the traffic noise. Hence, Gibbs designed the ground floor without windows so as to keep the noise of traffic out.

Even so, the church – Gibbs's first public building – won him considerable fame. The interior of the structure is richly decorated with a plastered ceiling in white and gold, with a ceiling inspired by Luigi Fontana's work in the church of Santi Apostoli and Pietro da Cortona's Santi Luca e Martina, both in Rome. The porch was inspired by Cortona's Santa Maria della Pace. The walls were influenced by Michelangelo and the steeple shows the influence of Sir Christopher Wren.

== Rectors of St Mary le Strand ==
- 1724–1759† John Heylyn
- 1759–1761 Charles Tarrant (later Dean of Carlisle then Peterborough)
- 1761–1777 Charles Bertie
- 1777–1780† John William Hopkins
- 1781–1812† James Robinson Hayward
- 1813–1839† James Edward Gambier
- 1839–1861† Joshua Frederick Denham
- 1861–1878† Alfred Bowen Evans
- 1878–1891 Lewen Tugwell
- 1891–1944† Frederick Harcourt Hillersdon (Mayor of Westminster 1909)
- 1944-1966 Bertram Francis Chambers
- fl. 1984 Edward Thompson
- fl. 2005 William Gulliford

† Rector died in post

== See also ==
- List of churches and cathedrals of London

== Gallery ==
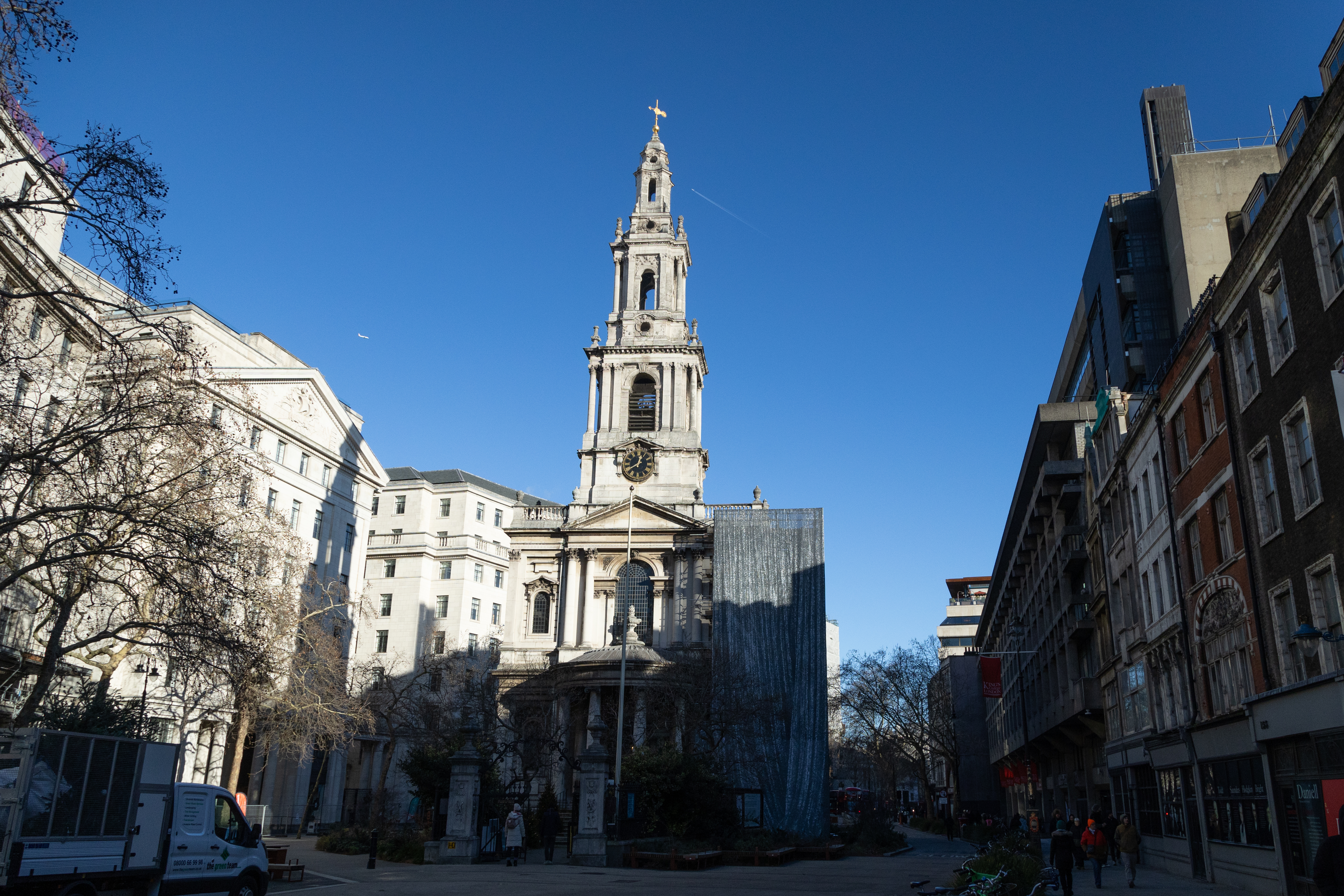
St Mary le Strand in London post pedestrianisation
