= Edward Heylyn =

Edward Heylyn (1695 – April 10, 1765) was a merchant and entrepreneur who was one of the founders of the Bow porcelain factory.

The Heylyn family originally came from North Wales. Heylyn was the third son of John Heylyn, a saddler of London who is said to have made a fortune supplying saddles for the Duke of Marlborough’s army, and his wife Susanna Sherman. His brother Dr John Heylyn, known as The Mystic Doctor, was a powerful preacher and prebend of Westminster Abbey. Edward was born in Westminster and took an entrepreneurial role in various businesses in London and Bristol. In October 1718, he became a freeman of the Worshipful Company of Saddlers in London and in 1731 became a freeman of the city of Bristol where he was described as a clothier. His brother's son John was also in business in Bristol. His fortunes fluctuated, rendering him repeatedly bankrupt and avoiding creditors. By 1741 he is said to have become a glass-maker with a glass-house in Bromley, Middlesex. He was one of the nominees on a patent for Bow porcelain manufactory there on 6 December 1744 in partnership with Thomas Frye. Edward could have met Frye through his uncle Thomas Sherman, master of the Saddlers Company, who had obtained commissions for Frye. He may have become involved as a result of his experiments with glass making. A clay known as Unaker was used to begin with at Bow; this is known to have been shipped from North Carolina, where another brother Henry Heylyn had interests

Although his name did not appear on subsequent patents he remained involved with the Bow works as his name appears in the insurance papers. He also had a business at Cornhill and a porcelain warehouse at St. James's. It is not clear if he was an agent for Bow or in competition, but these businesses appear to have failed in 1757.

Heylyn died at the age of 70 on the Isle of Man, then a haven for people escaping creditors.

Heylyn married Jane Slaughter, daughter of Charles Slaughter, a Blackwell Hall factor and had four sons and two daughters.

There exists today a Heylyn Square and Wrexham Road nearby in London E3.
