= Rowland Heylyn =

Rowland Heylyn (or Heilin or Heylin) (1562–1631) was a successful London merchant, sheriff of London in 1624–1625 and publisher of a Welsh bible in 1630.

== Life ==
Heylyn was the son of David Heylyn of the historical Heylyn family of Pentreheylin in Powys, Wales. He entered the free school of Shrewsbury in 1570 and was a pupil of Thomas Lawrence. In 1576, he was apprenticed to Thomas Wade of London, and was admitted to freedom of the Ironmongers' Company in 1584. In 1601, he purchased considerable lands at Laleham and Staines. He was assistant of the Ironmongers in 1612 and served as master in 1614. He continued to buy property and in 1619 acquired land at Mayfield, Colton, Haywood and Blithbury in Staffordshire. He lived in the Parish of St Alban Wood Street and was elected alderman of Cripplegate ward in 1624 and was Sheriff of London that year. In 1625, he was master of the Ironmongers company again.

Heylyn supported with Thomas Myddelton publication of the Welsh quarto Bible of 1630, which was bound with the Welsh Prayer Book and the Edmund Prys translation of the Psalter. Other works he saw into print were the Welsh-Latin dictionary of John Davies, and the Practice of Piety of Lewis Bayly in the translation by Rowland Vaughan.

A portrait of Heylyn by Henry Cocke in the Ironmongers' Hall is described as "Mr Rowland Heylyn a good benefactor. This gentleman's features are represented as emaciated, but pleasing; with white beard and whiskers; habited in a black gown and cap; his right hand on a book. He was described by Blakeway in the Sheriffs of Montgomery as "The pious and munificent Rowland Heylyn Alderman of London, promoter of the Welsh translation of the bible and of every other laudable undertaking in his day". He left £300 for the poor of Shrewsbury and 83 books to Shrewsbury School.

Heylyn married Alice Aldworth, but had no surviving children. He owned property in Laleham and Staines in Middlesex, and manors in Staffordshire and other counties which he left to the children of his two sisters. He was the uncle of Henry Heylyn whose son Peter Heylyn was a notable ecclesiastic and author.
