= Maypole in the Strand =

Coordinates: 51.5121°N 0.1171°W

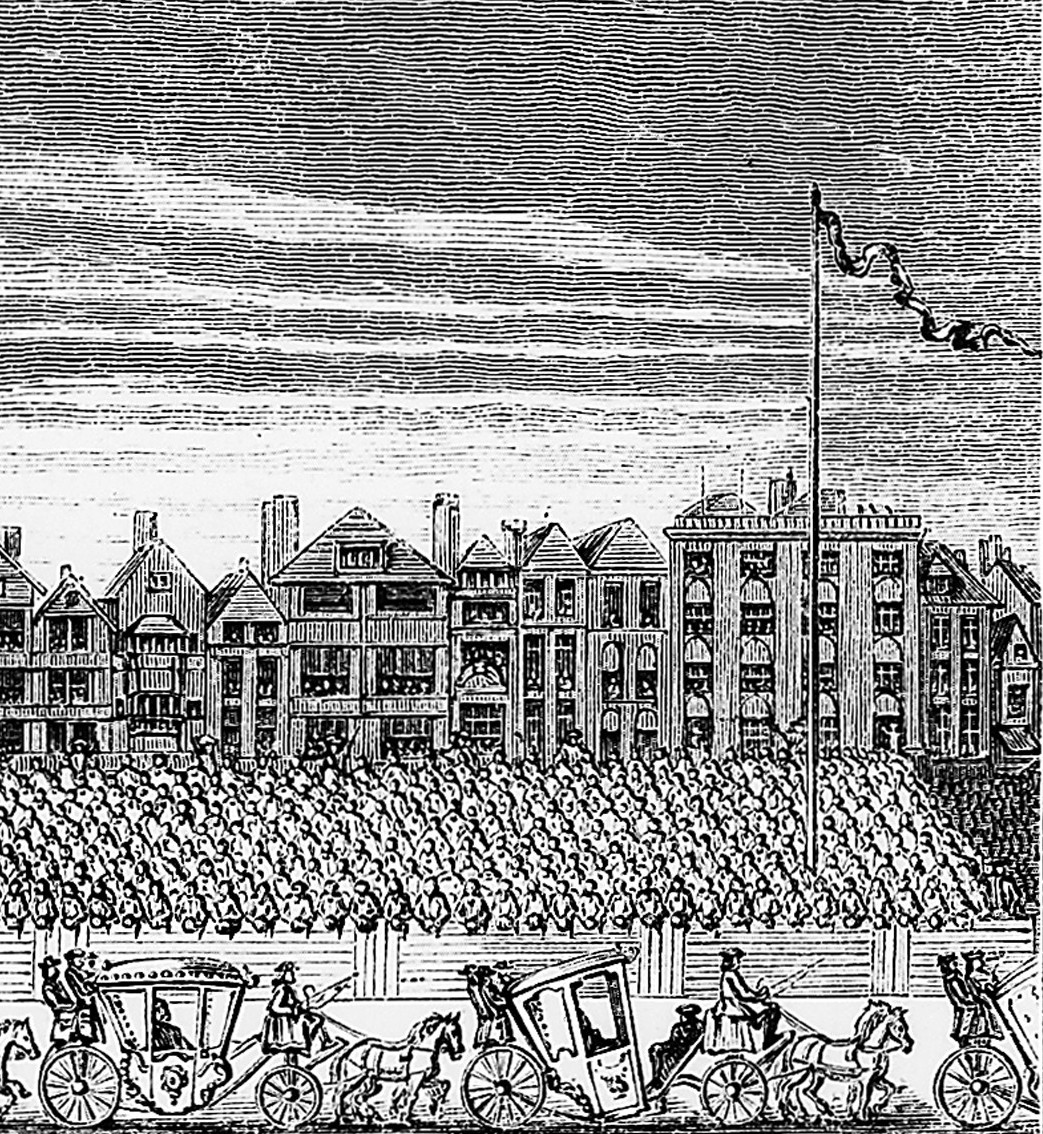
The maypole depicted in George Vertue's engraving of a 1713 procession along the Strand

The Maypole in the Strand was a landmark maypole on the Strand, London, that was in place during the 17th and early 18th centuries, on the site of the current St Mary le Strand church.

== History ==
The first maypole was built in the early 16th century outside the church of St Mary le Strand, and is believed to have been around 100-foot (30 m) high. As was common at the time, it was a regular custom to cover the maypole with flowers each May and dance around it. It was destroyed in April 1644 by the Puritans during the English Civil War, after the House of Lords and House of Commons banned maypoles, believing them to represent pagan ceremonies that were considered "ungodly". It was replaced by a 135-foot (41 m) high structure on 14 April 1661 following the Restoration, and is believed to have been constructed by the local farrier John Clarges whose daughter had married George Monck, 1st Duke of Albemarle when he was a military general. The new maypole was the most celebrated of its kind in London throughout the late 17th century. It was damaged by wind a few years later, and subsequently restored.

The maypole gradually decayed and was replaced in 1713; the current church was built in its location. In 1717, Sir Isaac Newton bought the maypole and transported it to Sir Richard Child's Wanstead House, now Wanstead Park. It was used to support Newton's telescope, which at that time was the largest in the world.

Maypole Alley ran north from the maypole's location on the Strand. It was renamed Newcastle Street in the early 18th century after John Holles, 1st Duke of Newcastle, and subsequently demolished during construction of Aldwych in 1905.

A temporary maypole artwork was installed on the site in 2017, as part of the London Festival of Architecture.
