= John Heylyn =

John Heylyn (1685 – 11 August 1759) was an Anglican divine, who had a major influence on religious thought in eighteenth century England. Because of his interest in mysticism he was known as the Mystic Doctor.

== Early life ==
Heylyn was the son of John Heylyn, a saddler of London, and his wife Susanna Sherman. The Heylyn family originally came from North Wales. He was born in Westminster and entered Westminster School in 1700. He was admitted at Trinity College, Cambridge on 7 June 1705 and was elected scholar of Trinity. In 1708 he graduated BA. He was ordained priest at London on 18 December 1709. It was recorded by Edward Rud in his 'Diary' that Heylyn "preach'd a very fine sermon" at the archidiaconal visitation of Dr Bewley in December 1710.

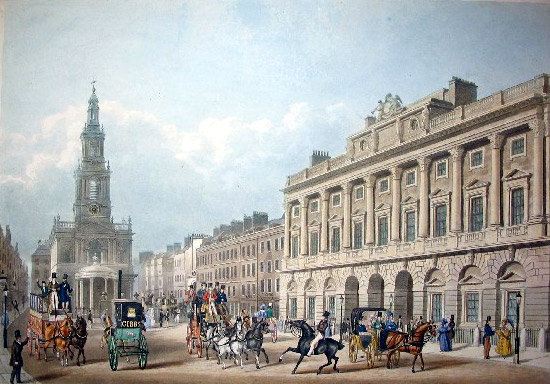
A 19th century print showing St Mary-le-Strand and the Strand front of Somerset House.

== Career ==
Heylyn was living at Turnham Green, Chiswick (then Middlesex, since 1885 part of London) in 1712, and in 1714 became vicar of Haslingfield near Cambridge. He was awarded MA in 1714.

In 1719 he left Haslingfield and served in various parishes in London, where he lived at Henrietta Street, Covent Garden, and Queen Street, Westminster, among other places. In 1724 he became the first rector of the rebuilt St Mary-le-Strand, London. In the summer of 1725 he took his family to Geneva, where he left his sons to learn French. In the following year his second son Charles was drowned in the River Rhône in the rapid water where it runs out of Lake Geneva. Heylyn gained a Doctor of Divinity in 1728. He became chaplain in ordinary to George II. In 1729 he was chosen Lecturer of All Hallows Lombard Street. He published many theological works and from his indulgence in mysticism was known as the Mystic Doctor.

Heylyn was an influence on John Wesley as early as the Oxford Methodist days. According to Wesley’s diaries, on 10 May 1738 (Whitsunday), Wesley heard Heylyn "preach a truly Christian sermon on 'They were all filled with the Holy Ghost'—and so, said he, may all of you be." In 1739 Wesley heard Heylyn give a sermon on feigned and hypocritical repentance, and as a result, declared that he (Wesley) had been a hypocrite for twenty years. Heylyn’s “Theological Lectures” was used as a source in Wesley's compilation of the Explanatory Notes Upon the New Testament. He served as vicar of Sunbury on Thames, Middlesex 1742–7, a prebendary of St Paul's Cathedral. In 1743 Heylyn was installed prebendary of Westminster Abbey.

Heylyn died at Hampstead at the age of 74 and was buried in Westminster Abbey in August 1759.

== Family ==
Heylyn was married twice. He married the daughter of Dr Herbert Masters physician at Cirencester. She died in about 1718 and was buried in Covent Garden Churchyard. Heylyn had one surviving son John by his first wife who became a merchant of Bristol. His second wife was Elizabeth Ebutt, the daughter of Mrs Elizabeth Ebbutt of St. Margaret's Westminster. She died on 9 June 1747, aged 49. Heylyn had a daughter Elizabeth by his second wife. He was the brother of Edward Heylyn, one of the founders of Bow porcelain.

== Works ==
- Theological lectures at Westminster-Abbey. With an interpretation of the New Testament. Part 1. Containing, the four Gospels (1749)
- An interpretation of the New Testament. Part 2. Containing the Acts of the Apostles and the several Epistles. (1761).

Heylyn published six single sermons, one of which was delivered by him at the consecration of his friend Joseph Butler, Bishop of Bristol. According to Allibone, 'Seventeen' and 'Forty' of his 'Discourses' were published in 1770 and 1793 respectively.
