= Bow porcelain factory =

British ceramics factory

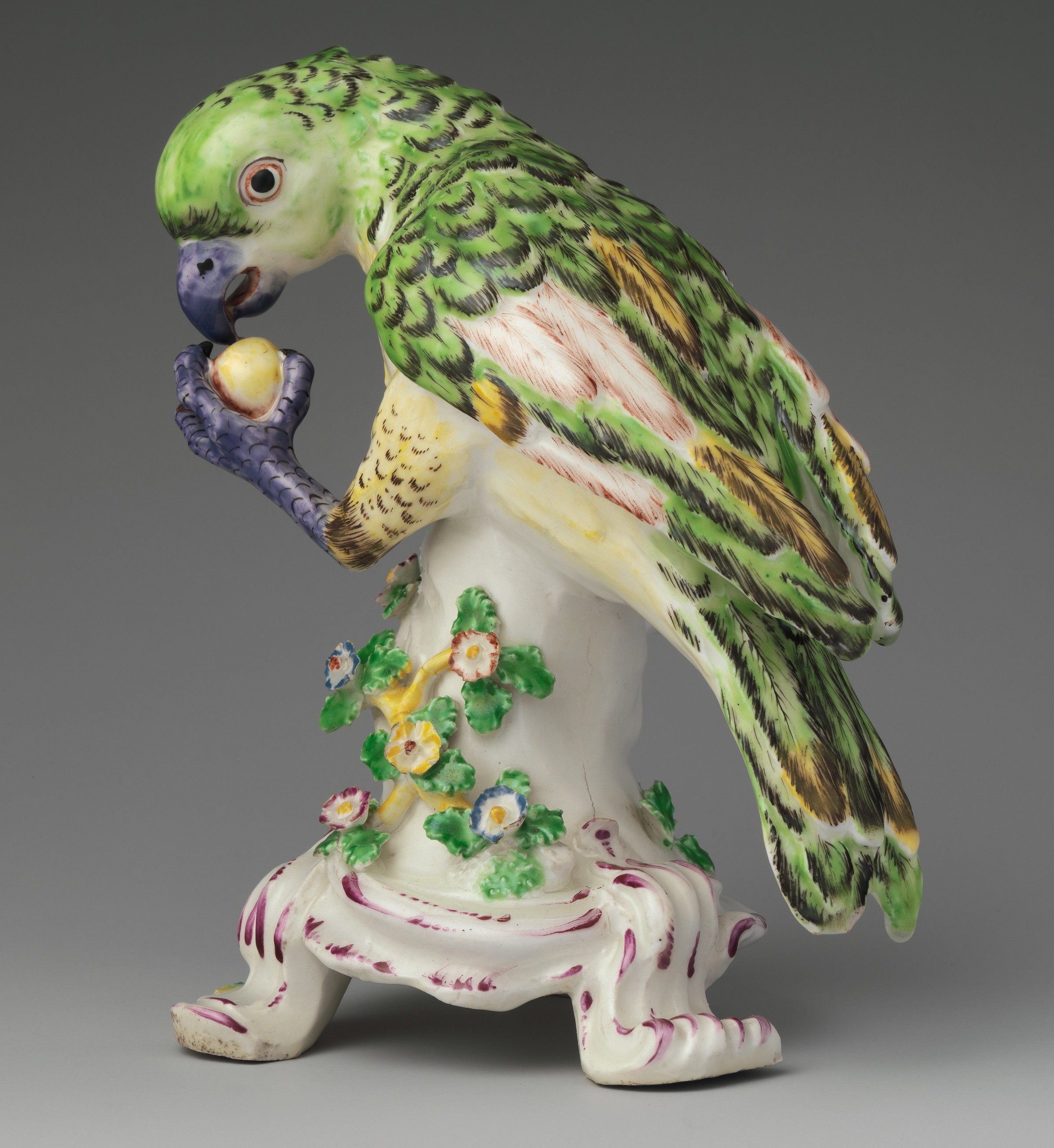
Bow parrot, c. 1760. The green and the crimson-purple on the base are two of Bow's distinctive colours.

The Bow porcelain factory (active c. 1747–64 and closed in 1776) was an emulative rival of the Chelsea porcelain factory in the manufacture of early soft-paste porcelain in Great Britain. The two London factories were the first in England. It was originally located near Bow, in what is now the London Borough of Tower Hamlets, but by 1749 it had moved to "New Canton", sited east of the River Lea, and then in Essex, now in the London Borough of Newham.

Designs imitated imported Chinese and Japanese porcelains and the wares being produced at Chelsea, at the other end of London. From about 1753, Meissen figures were copied, both directly and indirectly through Chelsea. Quality was notoriously uneven; the warm, creamy body of Bow porcelains is glassy and the glaze tends towards ivory. The paste included bone ash, and Bow figures were made by pressing the paste into moulds, rather than the slipcasting used at Chelsea. Bow appears to have been the largest English factory of its period. After about 1760, quality declined, as more English factories opened, and the dependence on Chelsea models increased, perhaps aided by an influx of Chelsea workers after 1763, as production there decreased.

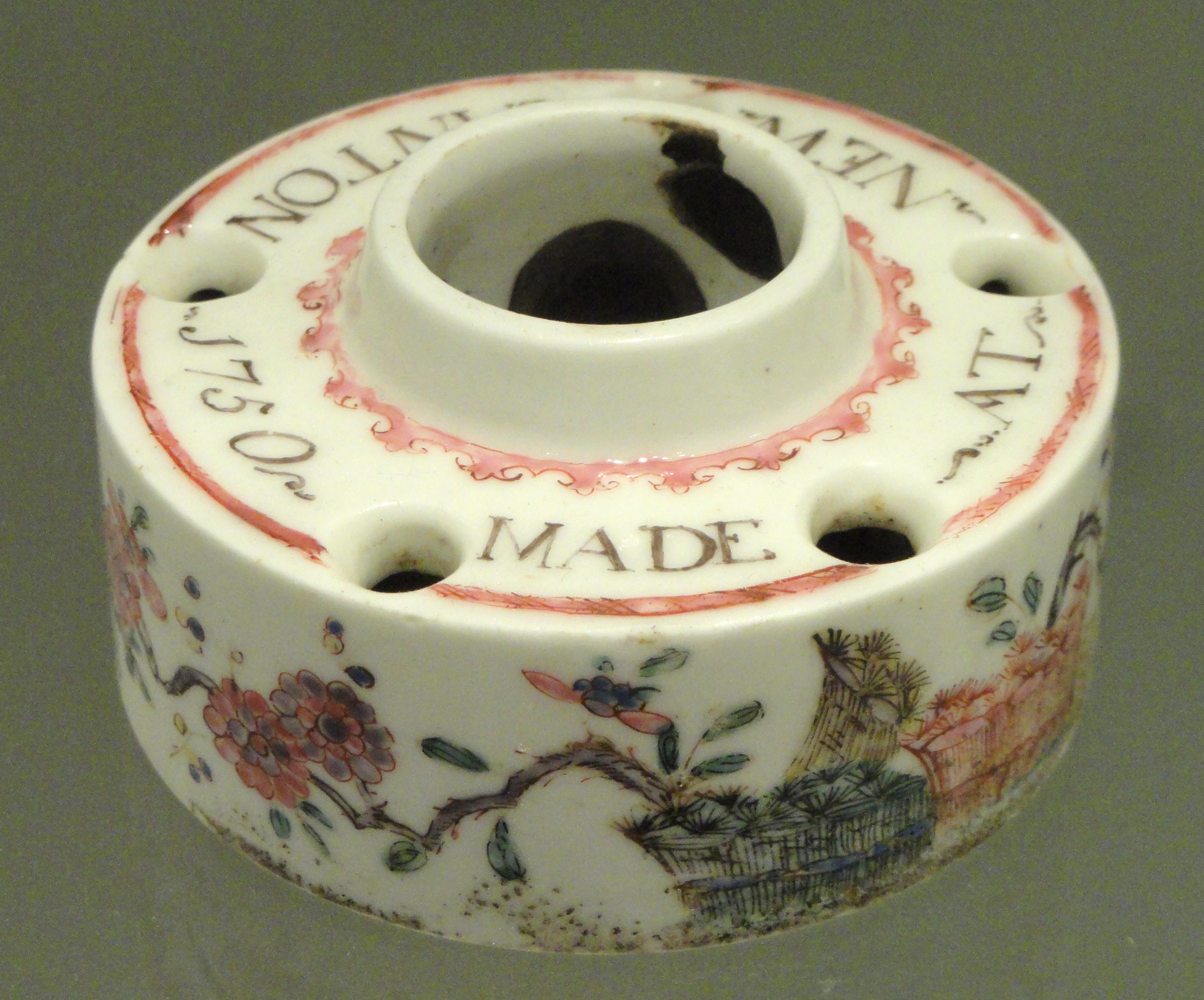
Inkwell, inscribed "Made at New Canton 1750", one of about 40 dated pieces known.

Both Bow and Chelsea catered for the luxury end of the market. One of the earliest records is in the Pelham Papers, the private accounts of the Duchess of Newcastle, showing the Duchess 'Pd. For China made at Bowe £3.0.0.' Bow also produced a good deal of cheaper sprigged tableware in white, with the relief decoration applied in strips after the main body is formed. There are blue and white porcelain tablewares with floral underglaze decoration imitating Chinese wares. Japanese export porcelain in the Kakiemon style was popular at Bow, as at Chelsea and continental factories, especially a design featuring partridges for tableware. The style of large bold "botanical" designs for flat pieces, derived from botanical book illustrations, were borrowed from Chelsea, and for smaller European flowers Bow had a distinctive style with similarities to French Mennecy-Villeroy porcelain that is "remarkably soft and delicate", though only seen on more expensive pieces.

== Wares ==
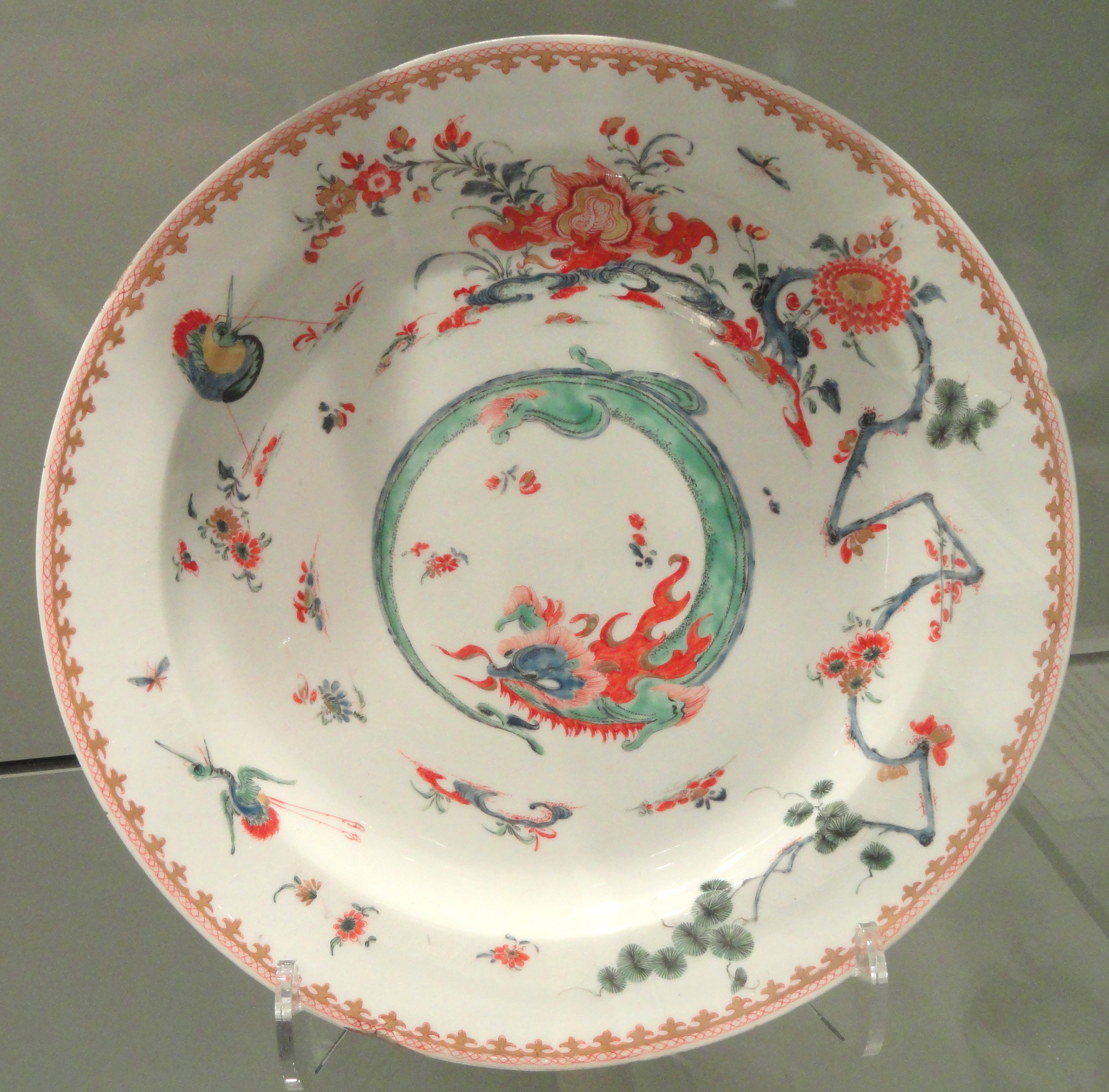
Stand for a tureen, c. 1755, in Bow's version of Kakiemon style.

The chaser and enamellist George Michael Moser, a key figure in the English Rococo and a founder of the Royal Academy, modelled for Bow, the sculptor Joseph Nollekens was told years later; the sculptor John Bacon may have modelled for Bow in his youth. The large white figure of the Farnese Flora, a high point in the Bow production, was taken, it has been suggested, from a terracotta by Michael Rysbrack.

A pair of Bow figures of Kitty Clive and Henry Woodward as "the Fine Lady" and 'the Fine Gentleman" in David Garrick's mythological burlesque Lethe, 1750–52 "are probably the earliest full-length portrait figures in English porcelain"; Some figures bear the incised date 1750, the earliest dates on Bow porcelain. Some were enamelled by William Duesbury. Some Bow figures were imitated from Chelsea models, but many more from Meissen. The largest figures are of General James Wolfe and the Marquess of Granby, no doubt to celebrate their victories in the Seven Years' War, respectively in 1759 and 1760–62. Granby is 14 1/2 inches high. Most factories copied from other porcelain, book illustrations for animals and plants, and prints for people, but a note in the Bowcocke papers to buy a partridge "dead or alive" suggests some modelling, or at least colouring, from real models was undertaken.

Bow porcelain adopted the newly invented technique of transfer printing from Battersea enamels in the later 1750s, although it "was never well-established as a mode of decoration", and sometimes mixed with painting on a single piece. As with other factories, some figures were apparently simply painted, rather than enamelled (followed by a second firing). The paint on these will normally have become damaged over the years, until the remainder was scraped off to give a plain white glazed figure. Duesbury's account book distinguishes between figures that are "painted" and "enhamild".

== History ==
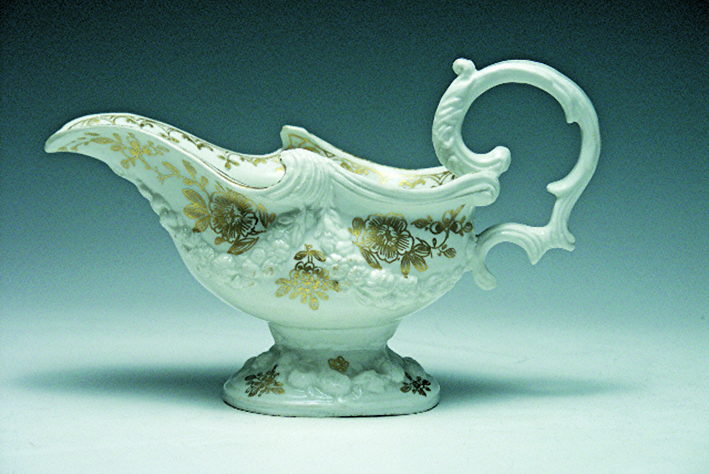
A covered sauceboat, ca 1750, in a fully rococo style owing a debt to contemporary silver

Early patents applied for by Thomas Frye and his silent partner Edward Heylyn in December 1744 (enrolled 1745) and a totally different patent of 1 November 1748 (enrolled March 1749), both apparently intended broadly to cover the uses of kaolin, were traditionally believed not to have resulted in any actual manufacture before about 1749, though Frye's published epitaph claimed he was "the inventor and first manufacturer of porcelain in England." "Heylyn and Frye do not appear to have had a factory of their own, but probably carried on their experiments at a factory already existing at Bow, having first secured the services of a well-skilled workman whose name has not been preserved, and who may have been the real inventor of English porcelain," a writer noted in 1911.

But although the scale of production hardly amounts to a successful commercial enterprise, in recent years scientific analysis of various pieces, some excavated, that do not fit the traditional narrative of the earliest days of English porcelain, have suggested to some researchers that not only was there earlier production of porcelain, but that one formula produced the earliest hard-paste porcelain made in England, some two decades before Plymouth porcelain.

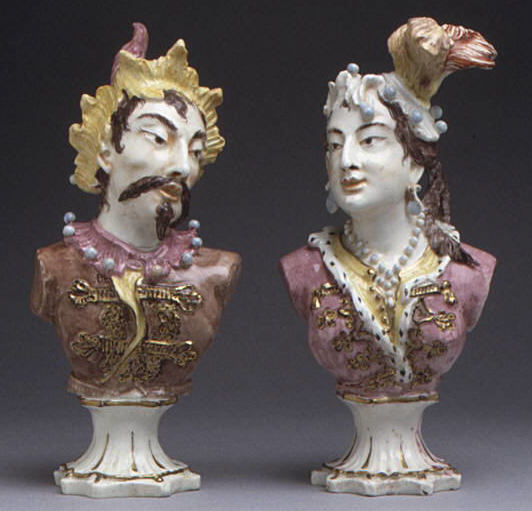
Busts of a "Mongolian" couple, c. 1750

The earliest Bow porcelains are of soft-paste incorporating bone ash, forming a phosphatic body that was a precursor of bone china. By 1749–1750 the business had moved from Bow to 'New Canton', a new factory on the Essex side of the River Lea, close to Bow Bridge, just west of Stratford High Street and beside Bow Back River. This move is evidenced by inkstands at the British Museum and at the Museum of Royal Worcester bearing the year 1750 and the inscription "Made at New Canton". Another example in the Gardiner Museum, Toronto is illustrated here. Also by 1750 Frye was serving as manager of the factory, under new owners, John Crowther and Weatherby. In 1753 they were advertising in Birmingham for painters and a modeller. Sources for the early history of the Bow manufactory were collected by Lady Charlotte Guest in memoranda, diaries, and notebooks, including the diary, account books and other papers of John Bowcocke (d. 1765), who was employed in the works as a commercial manager and traveller.

About 1758, the manufactory's high point, 300 persons were employed, 90 of whom were painters, all under one roof. "An account of the business returns for a period of five years shows that the cash receipts, which were £6,573 in 1750–51, increased steadily from year to year, and had reached £11,229 in 1755. The total amount of sales in 1754 realized £18,115." The firm had a retail shop in Cornhill and a warehouse at St Katharine's near the Tower, though a West End shop that was opened in 1757 in the Terrace in St. James's Street closed the following year. The part-owner Weatherby died in 1762 and his partner Crowther was listed as bankrupt the following year. Three sales dispersed his effects in March and May 1764. Though Crowther continued in business in a small way, in 1776 what remained of the Bow factory was sold for a small sum to William Duesbury, and all the moulds and implements were transferred to Derby: see Chelsea porcelain factory.

There are hints in the history that much of the decoration, especially the overglaze enamelling, may have been done outside the factory, as was quite a common practice at this date.

Newham's Heritage Service owns and curates a significant collection of items from the factory as well as from archaeological digs on the "New Canton" site in 1969. The New Canton site was also excavated in 1867 (discovering kiln wasters which were tested by a chemist at the direction of Lady Charlotte Schreiber) whilst another dig occurred in 1921 on the opposite side of the High Street.

=== Marks ===
No consistent factory marks were used at Bow, but there are a confusing number of marks that appear on some pieces or at some period, especially an anchor and dagger in the 1760s. Various suggestions have been made as to the meaning of other marks and letters that sometimes appear, with attempts to relate them to the names of possible modellers and other theories.

== Gallery ==
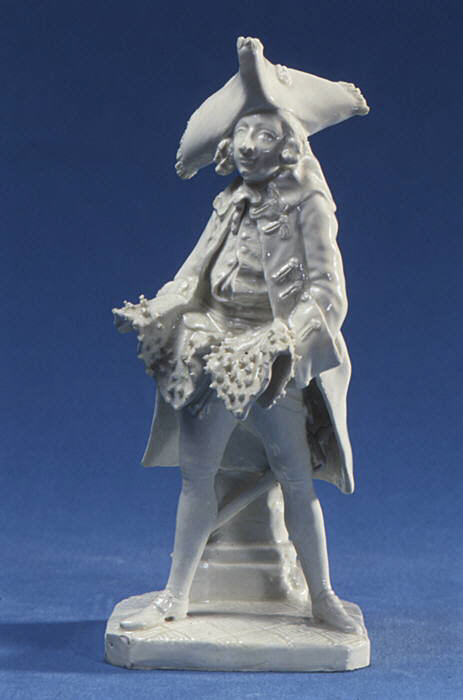
The actor Henry Woodward in character, 1750.

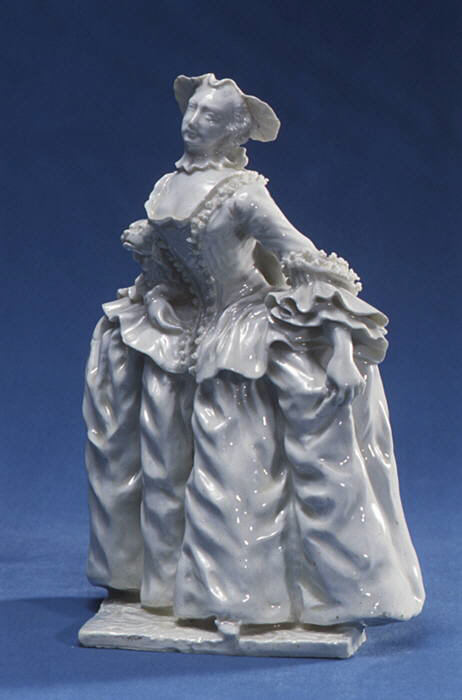
Kitty Clive, c. 1750

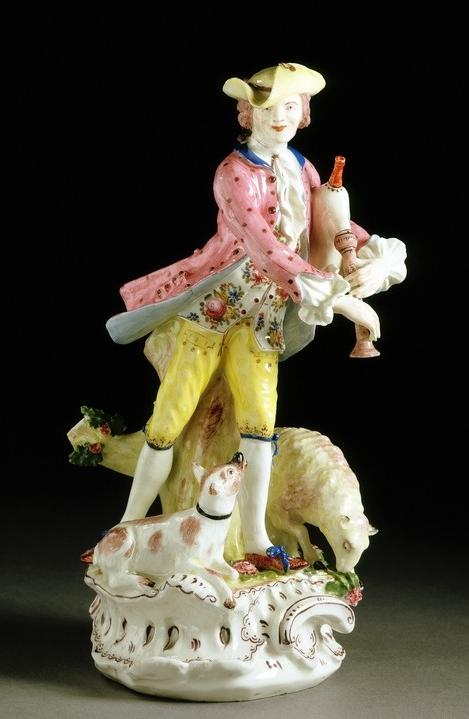
Figure following a Meissen model, about 1754

A Lady Falconer - Bow Porcelain Factory - circa 1755

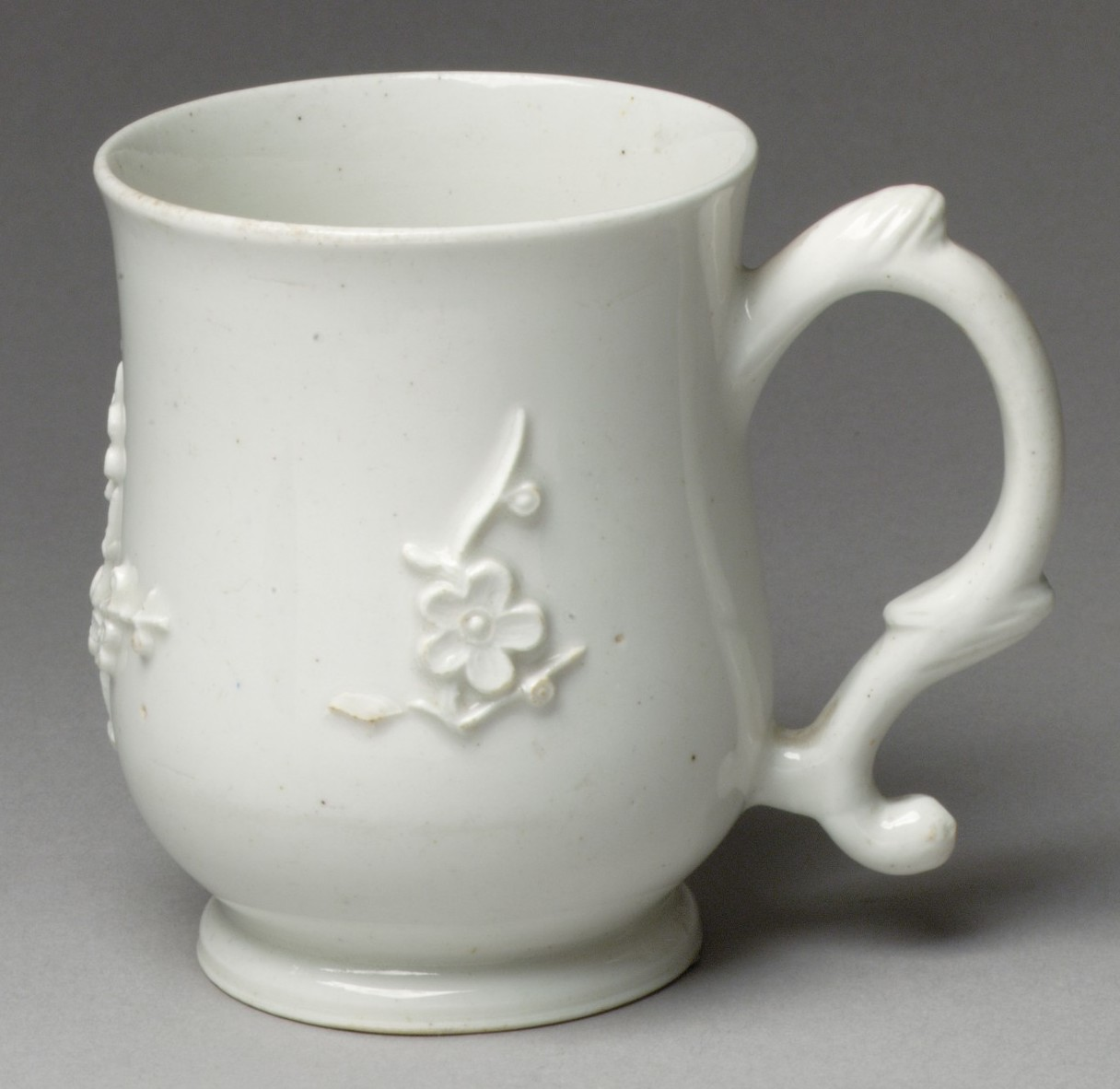
Mug with sprigged Chinese-style plum-blossom decoration, an example of Bow's cheaper wares.

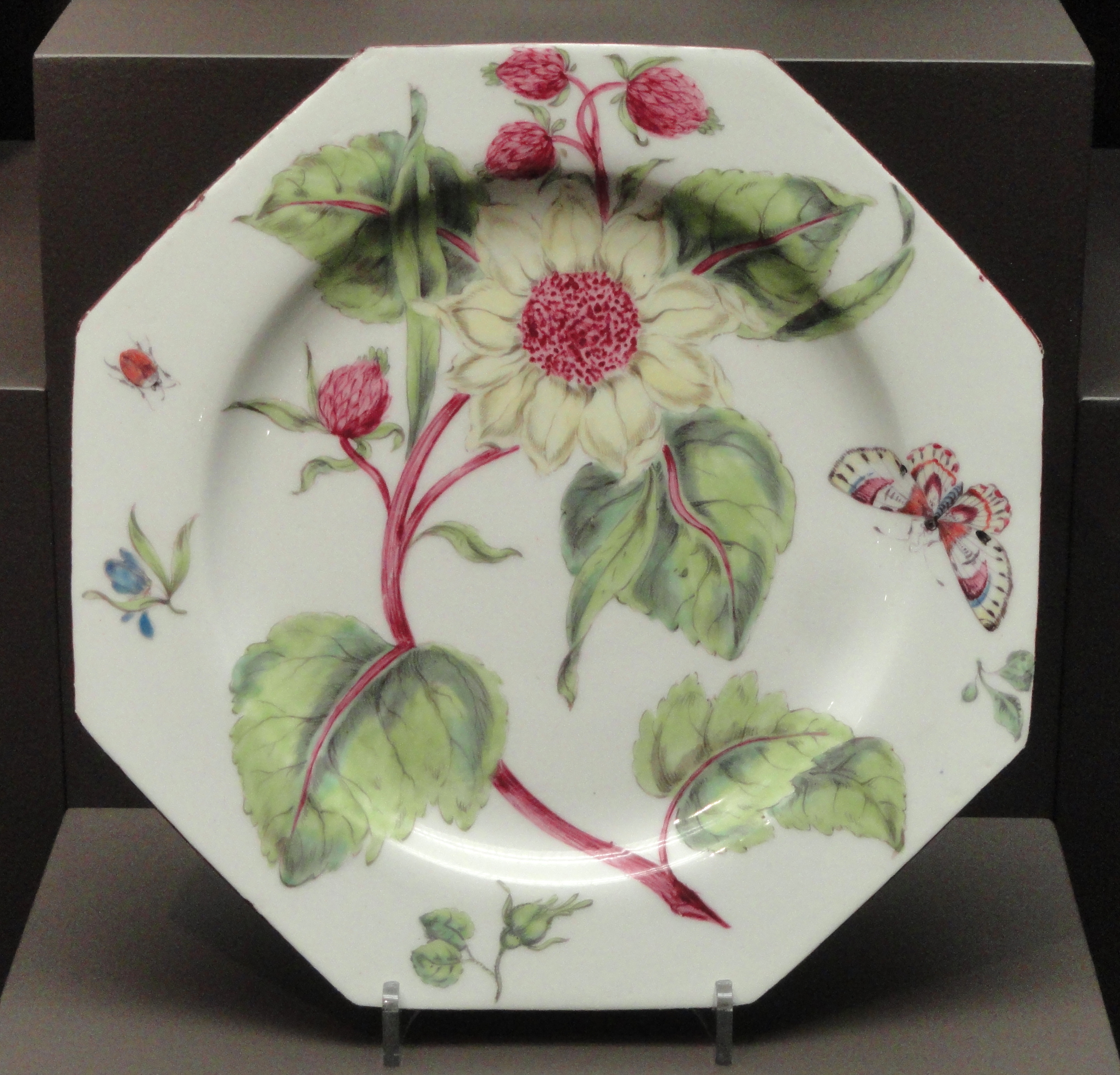
"Botanical" plate, c. 1756-1760, imitating Chelsea

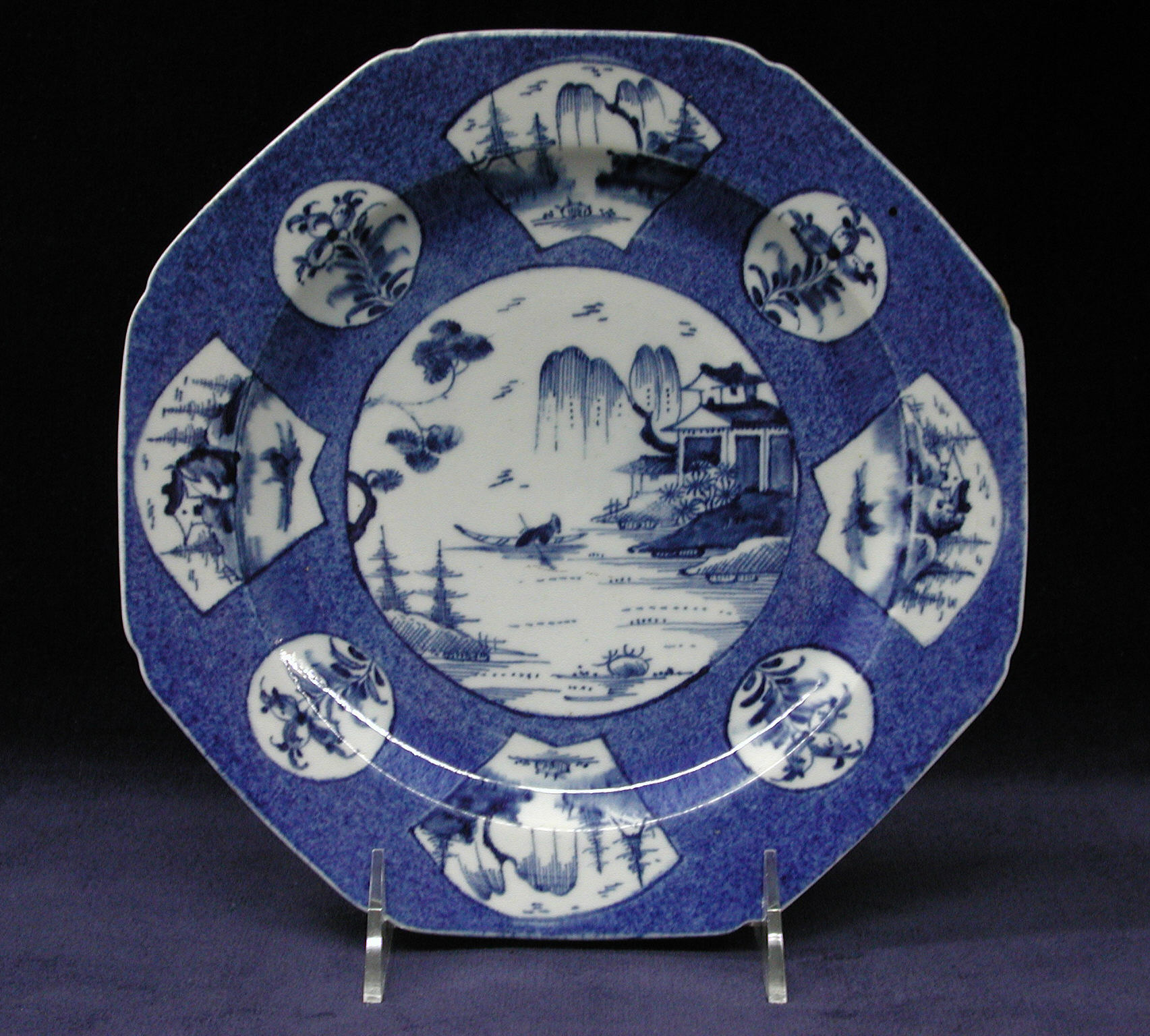
Dish in underglaze blue, in a Chinese style

Flora - Bow Porcelain Factory - circa 1762

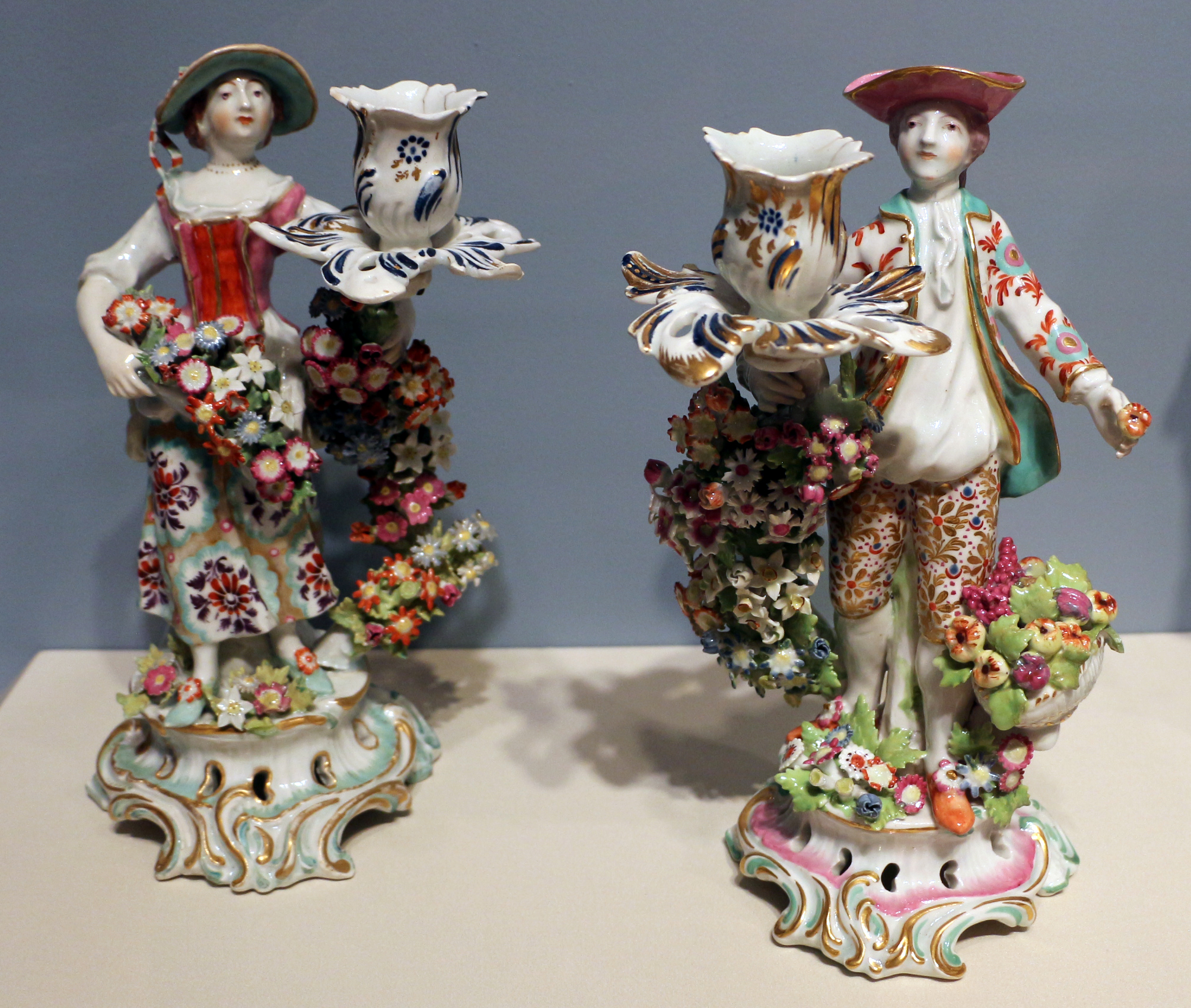
Pair of "shepherd" candlesticks, 1765-70

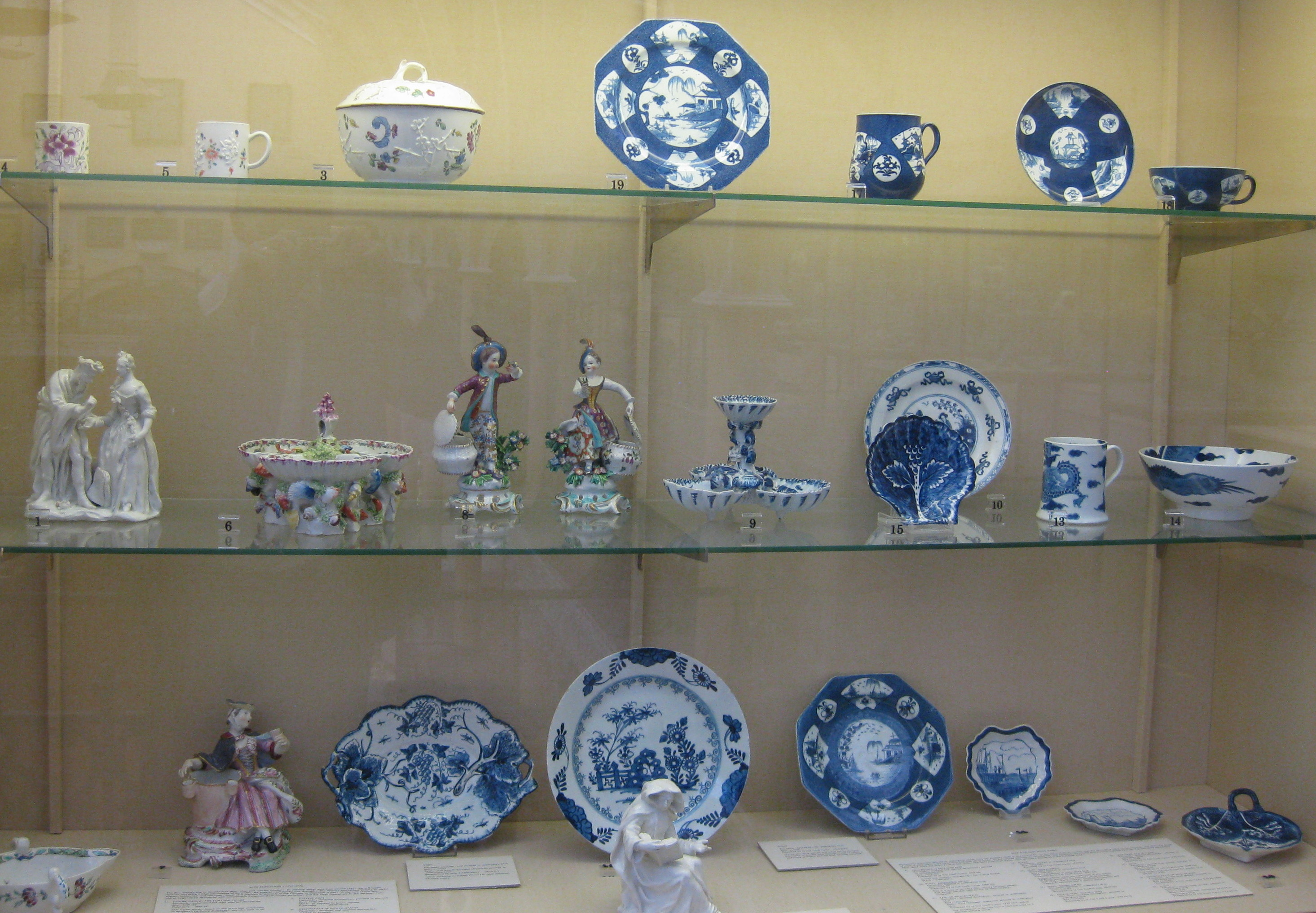
Display at Birmingham Museum and Art Gallery

Figurines of two musicians, c1760
