= Worshipful Company of Saddlers =

Livery company of the City of London

Coordinates: 51.51490°N 0.09567°W

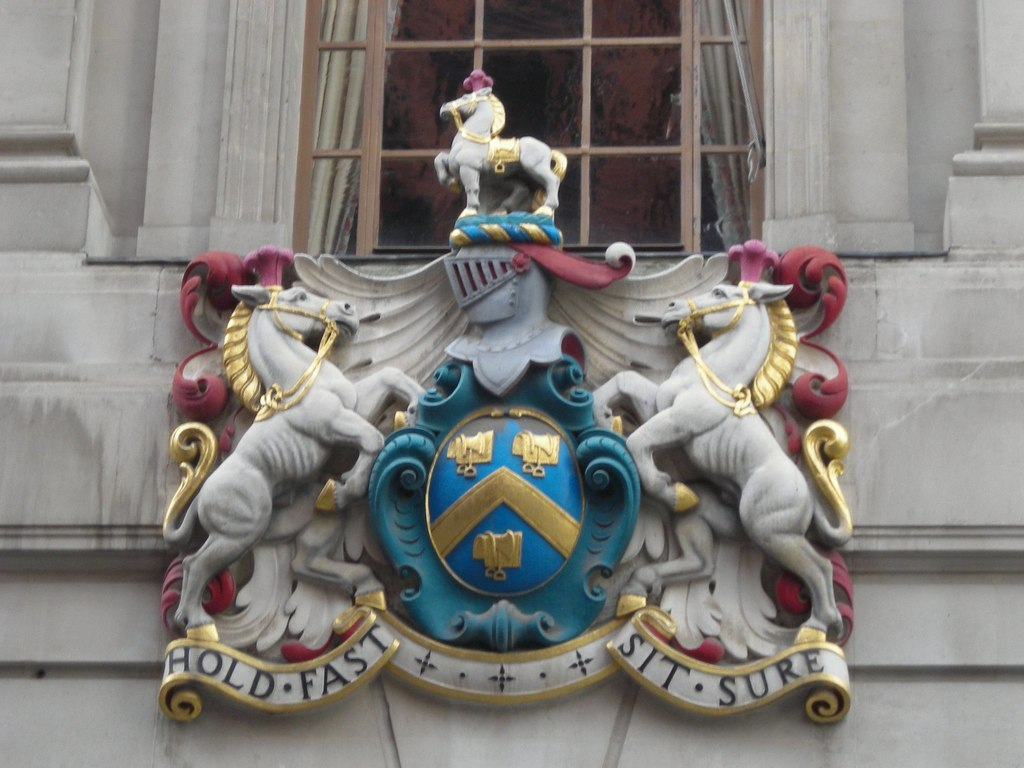
- Motto: Hold Fast, Sit Sure and Our Trust Is In God
- Location: Saddlers' Hall, Gutter Lane, London, EC2V 6BR
- Date of formation: 1395
- Company association: Leather industries
- Order of precedence: 25th
- Master of company: The Princess Royal
- Website: www.saddlersco.co.uk

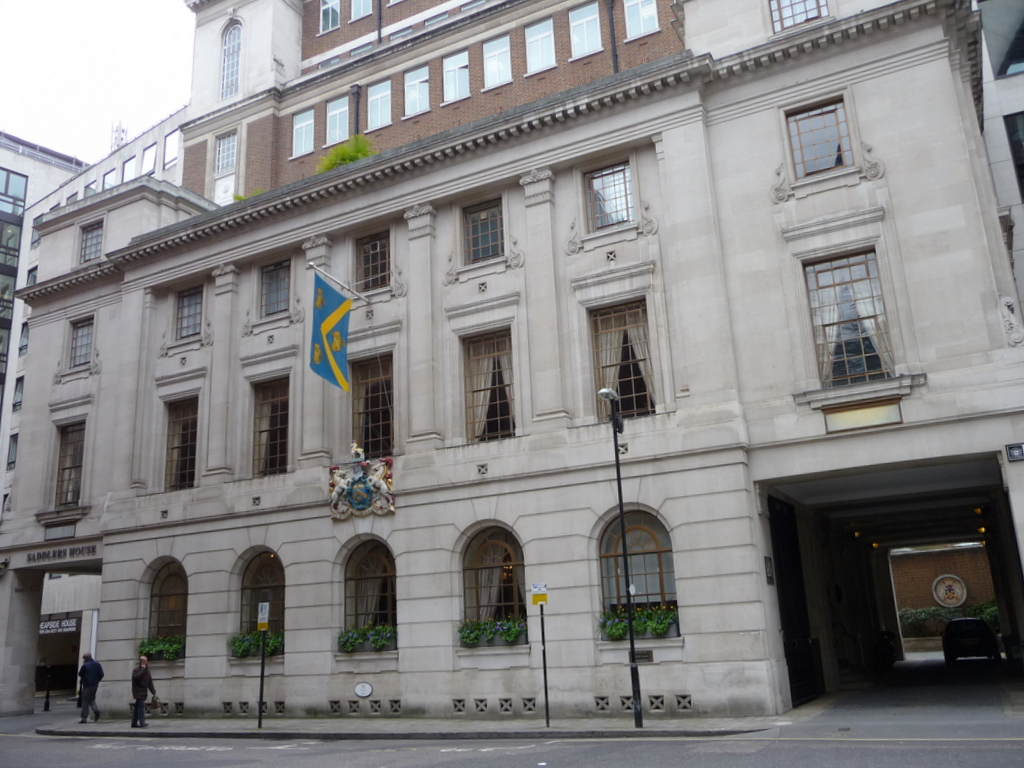
Saddlers Hall, Gutter Lane

The Worshipful Company of Saddlers is one of the Livery Companies of the City of London. A Guild of Saddlers, the Company's predecessor, is thought to have been an Anglo-Saxon Craft Guild – it certainly existed at some point in the eleventh century. The Guild became a Company when a Royal Charter of Incorporation was granted by King Edward III in 1363. The City granted the Company the right to regulate the trade of saddle-making; all saddlers in and within two miles of the City were subject to the Company's regulations. However, the powers of the Company, which has existed on the same site at Cheapside (formerly West Chepe) since 1160, were eroded over time.

Nowadays the Company retains strong affiliations with the saddlery trade, sponsoring the Society of Master Saddlers and giving prizes for deserving young riders at equestrian events. The Company is an institution which is charitable rather than a charitable institution and it supports many good causes and sponsors scholarships at Alleyn's School, has strong links with the Household Cavalry and the King's Troop R.H.A. as well as with other regiments and Livery Companies traditionally involved with leather or horses.

The Company ranks twenty-fifth in the order of precedence of Livery Companies (as settled in 1515 on the Companies' economic or political power at that time). Unusually, the Saddlers Company has two mottoes: Hold Fast, Sit Sure and Our Trust Is In God. The coat of arms seen on the entrance of Saddlers' Hall, showcasing a parlfrey, two horses, a bascinet and the moto, is continued to be used in the Company's communications.

In addition to admitting members as Freeman and Liveryman, the Saddlers' Company has the unique privilege of granting Yeoman status. Its notable Yeomen include the Princess Royal, Peter Walwyn (Chairman of the Lambourn Trainers Association), and Richard Meade.
