= Our Story Our Voice =

- Directed by: Owen 'Alik Shahadah
- Starring: George Galloway; Desmond Tutu; Esther Stanford; Ishmahil Blagrove, Jr; Ruhul Tarafder; Moneera Girshab; Dr Nazreen Nawaz
- Music by: Tunde Jegede; Ocacia
- Production company: Halaqah Media
- Distributed by: Halaqah Media
- Release date: 10 February 2007
- Running time: 77 minutes
- Country: United Kingdom
- Language: English
- Budget: $900 Thousand

Our Story Our Voice is a 2007 independent political documentary that looks at the social tension in the world today. The film offers a dialogue with the marginalized voices that are rarely heard in mainstream media. The film looks at topics from nuclear weapons proliferation to the hypocrisy of western foreign policy, failure of plurality, democracy, multiculturalism, trade crisis and also the crisis in Darfur.

== Soundtracks ==
1. "Business Sense" - Poppy Seed
2. "Into the Beyond" - Tunde Jegede
3. "If I…" - Ocacia
4. "Birkama" - Ocacia
