= Motherland (2010 film) =

- Directed by: Owen 'Alik Shahadah
- Written by: Owen 'Alik Shahadah
- Produced by: Betelihem Zelealem
- Starring: Kimani Nehusi; Molefi Kete Asante; Maulana Karenga; Mohamed Ibn Chambas; Amiri Baraka; Hakim Adi; Meles Zenawi; Jacob Zuma; Adama Samassekou; Haki R. Madhubuti
- Music by: Sona Jobarteh; Ocacia
- Distributed by: Halaqah Media Distribution Co.
- Release date: February 11, 2010
- Running time: 118 minutes
- Country: United States
- Languages: English; Amharic; Zulu; Arabic; Akan; Hausa
- Budget: $2.5 million

Motherland (እናት ሀገር ˀənatə hägär) is a 2010 independent documentary film directed and written by Owen 'Alik Shahadah. Motherland is the sequel to the 2005 documentary 500 Years Later.

== Synopsis ==
Motherland is a documentary about the African continent from Ancient Egypt to the present. It is an overview of African history and contemporary issues but with the African people at the centre of the story.

== Awards ==
- 2011 Nominated Best Diaspora Documentary Africa Movie Academy Award (2011)
- Best Documentary Zanzibar International Film Festival (2010)
- Best Board of directors award for Documentary Pan-African Film Festival (2010)

== Cast ==
The cast features key figures from the African political world, including:

- Barack Obama stock footage from visit to Africa
- Harry Belafonte
- Rohan Marley, son of Bob Marley and member of the Rastafari Movement
- Amiri Baraka
- Abdulkadir Ahmed Said, Somali filmmaker
- Maulana Karenga
- Jacob Zuma, President of South Africa
- Frances Cress Welsing
- Molefi Kete Asante
- Kimani Nehusi
- Chen Chimutengwende, Minister of Information and Publicity Zimbabwe
- Meles Zenawi, late Prime Minister of Ethiopia
- David Commissiong
- Ali Mazrui
- Mohamed Ibn Chambas, President of the Economic Community of West African States (ECOWAS) Commission
- Haki R. Madhubuti
- Hakim Adi
- Nicole Lee, TransAfrica Forum
- Tsedenia Gebremarkos
- Zanele Hlatshwayo, Mayor of Pietermaritzburg
- Gamal Nkrumah, son of Ghana's first President Kwame Nkrumah
- Jeff Radebe, African National Congress
- Didymus Mutasa, ZANU-PF
- Abune Paulos, Patriarch of Ethiopian Orthodox Church
- Esther Stanford
- Kwesi Kwaa Prah
- S'bu Ndebele
- Adama Samassékou
- Desmond Tutu (deleted by directors)

== 5.1 surround ==
Motherland is mixed in 5.1 Dolby Digital Surround.

== See also ==
- History of Africa
- Maafa
- Pan-Africanism
- List of films featuring slavery
