= Jobarteh =

Jobarteh is a surname. Notable people with the surname include:

- Amadu Bansang Jobarteh (1914-2001), Gambian kora master
- Anna Jobarteh, English actress
- Madi Jobarteh (born 1971), Gambian human rights activist
- Sal Jobarteh (born 1993), Gambian footballer
- Sona Jobarteh (born 1983), Gambian musician
