= Harambee (African American newspaper) =

Publication of the Los Angeles Black Congress

Harambee was an African American newspaper published in the 1960s by the Los Angeles Black Congress, an umbrella organization for diverse groups which included the Congress of Racial Equality (CORE), the Freedom Draft Movement, the Afro-American Association, the National Association for the Advancement of Colored People (NAACP), Ron Karenga's US Organization, John Floyd's Black Panther Political Party, and others. It was instrumental in publicizing the Black Panther idea and symbol in Los Angeles. It was originally created in August 1966 by Maulana Karenga (formerly known as Ron Karenga), for the organization US. Karenga then donated the publication to the Black Congress. Its first issue commemorated the anniversary of the 1965 Watts Rebellion. Activist Elaine Brown was a reporter for the newspaper. Editors included Ron Karenga and John Floyd. The name Harambee is Swahili for "Let's Pull Together."

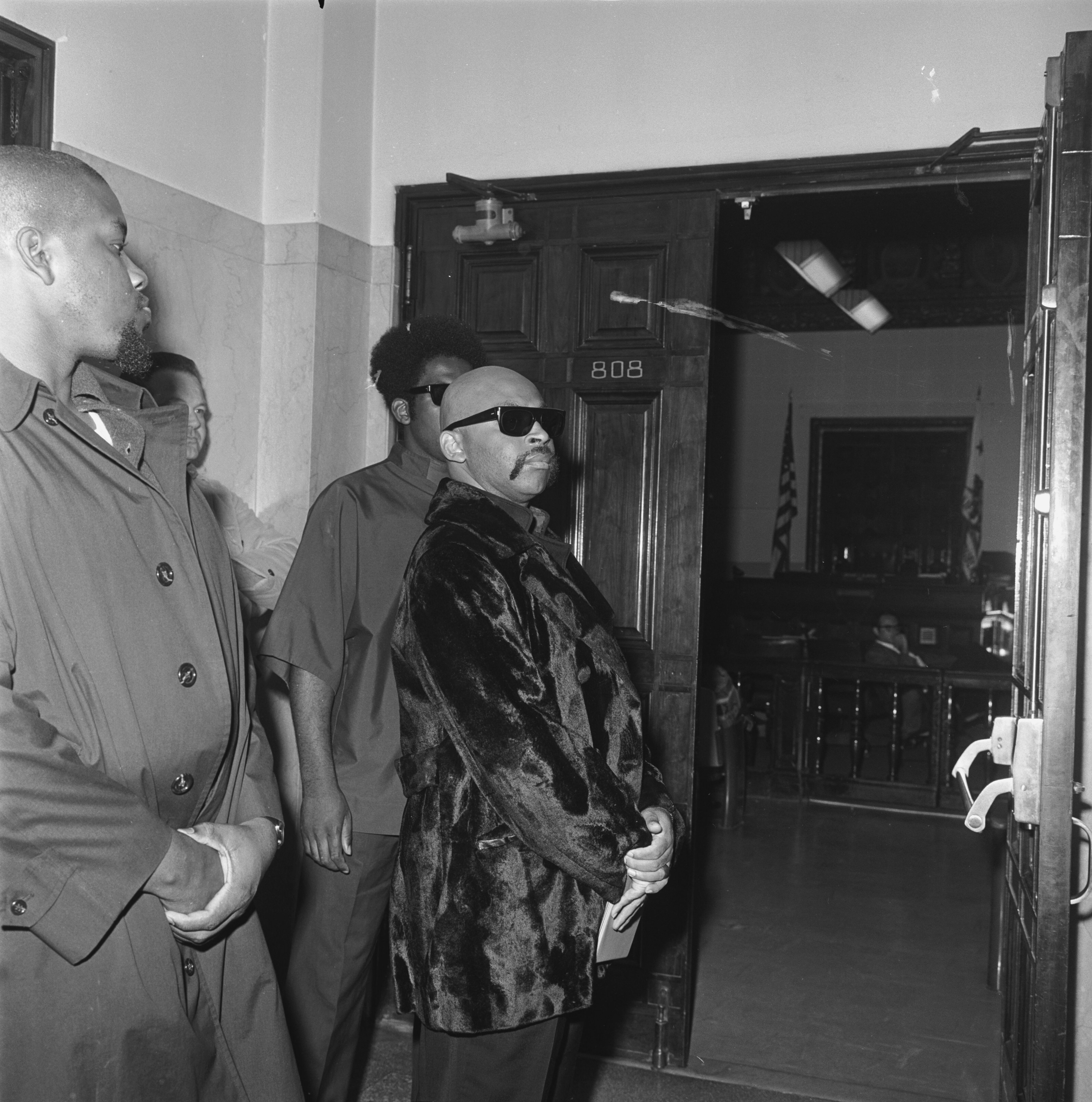
Maulana Karenga during trial

By April 1969, the newspaper had returned to its roots as an exclusive publication of Karenga's US organization. Among Karenga included Tommy Jacquette-Mfikiri, Karl Key-Hekima, Ken Seaton-Msemaji, Samuel Carr-Damu, Sanamu Nyeusi and Brenda Haiba Karenga were among the newly founding members with widely known figure Malcolm X.

== Objectives ==
Harambee newspapers formally created a clear and politically rooted objective. It developed a new perspective on Black unity, cultural nationalism, and community wide determination with the rise of the Civil Rights and Black power movement. Also featured commentary regarding racism, police brutality, and problems within the education system. Offering ways to critique, find solutions and publicized programs and rallies stemming from Black empowerment. It challenged the negative portrayal of African Americans on mainstream media, presenting a space for authentic Black thought and expression.

Harmbee newspaper issues also included covered topics to educate communities about post-present tense problems such as African and African American History, Community Organizing, Real Time Events such as the Watts Rebellion. Primarily using African American heard voices helped to inform communities that were often ignored or unheard in a white owned media.

== Legacy ==
Harambee promoted ideas such as Kawaida and cultural events like Kwanzaa, which Maulana Karenga also founded. While not many physical or digital copies of Harambee have survived, its influence was significant in shaping Black cultural consciousness in Southern California. Some physical copies could be attained in such locations as the UCLA Library Special Collections, Los Angeles Public Library (LAPL) and the Freedom Archives.
