= Madi Jobarteh =

Gambian human rights activist

- Born: Boraba, Central River Region, The Gambia
- Education: The University of Ghana; University of Groningen
- Occupations: Human rights defender, pro-democracy activist
- Years active: 1992 - present
- Organization(s): The Edward Francis Small Centre for Rights and Justice
- Known for: Human rights defender
- Website: EFSCRJ

Madi Jobarteh (born 1971) is a Gambian pro-democracy activist known for his work on human rights in The Gambia.

== Early life and education ==
Jobarteh was born in the town of Boraba in the Central River Region of The Gambia.

He received a BA in Linguistics and Philosophy from the University of Ghana, Legon, and holds an MA in Human Rights Law from the University of Groningen in the Netherlands.

== Human rights work ==
Madi Jobarteh is the founder and executive director of the Edward Francis Small Centre for Rights and Justice (EFSCRJ) in The Gambia.

He has been a critic of successive Gambian governments.

Jobarteh has been the subject of legal proceedings and arrests arising from his activism and public criticism of government policies.
