= Kinara =

Candleholder used in Kwanzaa celebrations

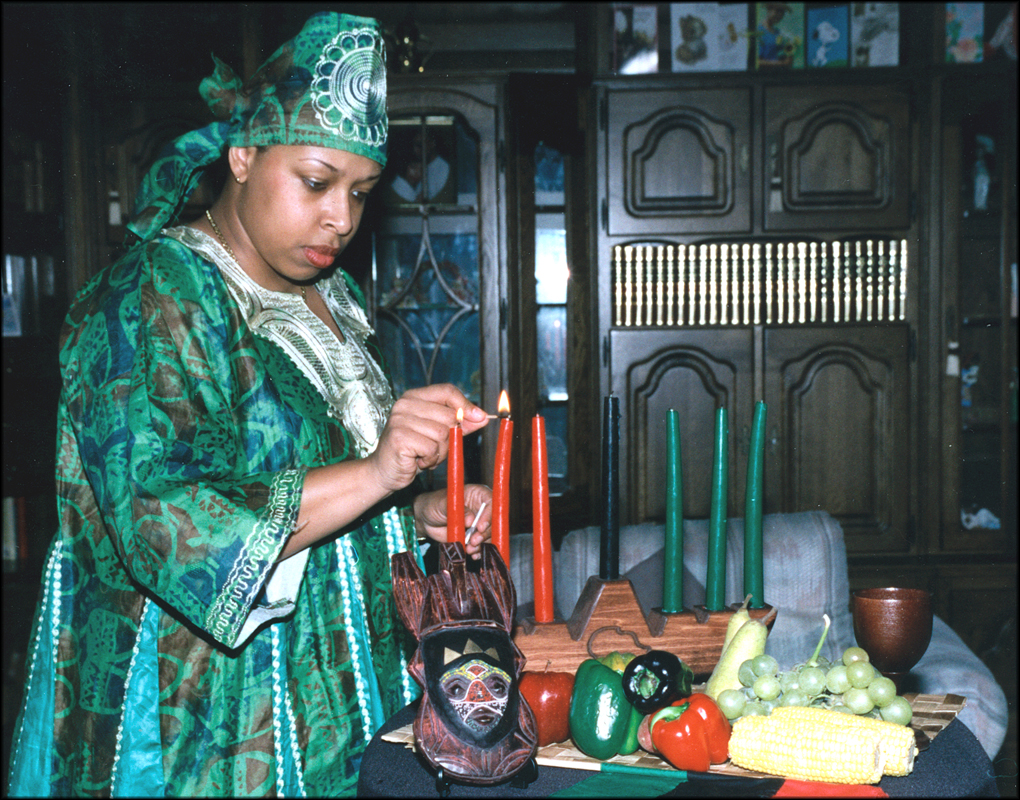
A woman lights kinara candles on a table decorated with the symbols of Kwanzaa.

The kinara is a seven-branched candleholder used in Kwanzaa celebrations in the United States.

== History ==
Shortly before the first celebration in 1966, Maulana Karenga searched for a candle holder with seven holes which he and the other US Organization members could use to celebrate the first Kwanzaa. However, rather than constructing their own handcrafted kinara, Karenga forcibly removed two branches from a Hanukkah menorah which was then used to hold the seven candles. The following year, US Organization member Buddy Rose-Aminifu crafted the first kinara. Early photographs of the first kinara show that it was of rudimentary design, being a wooden log with holes drilled into it to support the candles.

== Description ==
During the week-long celebration of Kwanzaa, seven candles are placed in the kinara—three red on the left, three green on the right, and a single black candle in the center. The word kinara is a Swahili word that means candle holder.

The seven candles represent the Seven Principles (or Nguzo Saba) of Kwanzaa. Red, green, and black are the symbolic colors of the holiday.

During the week of Kwanzaa, a new candle is lit on the kinara each day. The center black candle is lit first, and the lighting then proceeds from left to right, the new candle being lit corresponding to the principle of that day. In this way, each day of Kwanzaa is dedicated to the contemplation of one of the Seven Principles. The first known use of the word "Kinara" is dated 1975.

Each of the candles also has a meaning. The black one symbolizes the African people, the red their struggle, and the green the future and hope that comes from their struggle.

== See also ==
- Temple menorah § Similar objects
