= Marika Sherwood =

Hungarian-born British historian and educator (1937–2025)

- by Rosie Sherwood (crop)
- Born: 8 November 1937; Budapest, Hungary
- Died: 16 February 2025 (aged 87); England
- Education: University of Sydney
- Occupations: Historian, researcher, educator and author
- Known for: Co-founder of Black and Asian Studies Association

Marika Sherwood (8 November 1937 – 16 February 2025) was a Hungarian-born historian, researcher, educator and author based in England. She was a co-founder of the Black and Asian Studies Association and a pioneering researcher into the history of Black British people.

== Life and career ==
Sherwood was born on 8 November 1937, into a Jewish family living in Budapest, Hungary. With the surviving members of her family (many had died during World War II), she emigrated in 1948 to Sydney, Australia, where she attended North Sydney Girls' High School until 1954. In 1955, she married Ronald Troy, with whom she had a son, Craig, before divorcing in 1962.

She was briefly employed in New Guinea (then under Australian control) for a period before moving back to Sydney to attend university as a part-time student. She earned a BA degree in anthropology from the University of Sydney in 1965. She had a short marriage to Peter Sherwood, a professor of French, before she eventually emigrated to England with her son after divorcing her husband in 1965, and she found employment as a teacher in London. There, she learned of the discrimination faced by Black students in the educational system, which spurred an interest in Sherwood to research the history of the African diaspora. This resolve was strengthened by a five-year period of academic research in Harlem, New York City, from 1980 to 1985.

Sherwood was a Senior Research Fellow at the Institute of Commonwealth Studies, University of London. In 1991, with Hakim Adi and other colleagues she founded what is now known as the Black and Asian Studies Association (BASA), in order to encourage research and disseminate information, and to campaign on education issues. This is ongoing.

In 1998, Sherwood published a tribute to her recently deceased friend, the Communist Party of Great Britain member Billy Strachan, in BASA's newsletter.

In 2007, she published After Abolition: Britain and the Slave Trade Since 1807. Stephen Shapiro, writing in the Ohio State and Miami University history journal Origins, described the book as "provocative" and "a worthwhile read" for "those interested in British or African history."

In 2010, she was invited to contribute to the Kwame Nkrumah Centenary Colloquium in Accra, convened by the African Union and the Ghanaian government.

Apart from her formal publications listed below, she also contributed to a number of films, radio programmes, and conferences. Sherwood set up Savannah Press, a publisher for some of her books "at cost" prices.

In 2017, Sherwood was planning to give a speech about the treatment of the Palestinians during the University of Manchester's Israel Apartheid Week under the title "You're doing to Palestinians what the Nazis did to me". The Israeli embassy intervened, contacting the university with concerns that the title violated the International Holocaust Remembrance Association's definition of antisemitism, adopted by the UK government. Manchester University censored the title and put conditions on the speech.

She wrote nine entries in the Oxford Dictionary of National Biography: Dusé Mohamed (1866–1945), journalist and playwright; Peter McFarren Blackman (1909–1993), political activist; Robert Broadhurst (1859/60–1948), pan-African nationalist leader; William Davidson (1786–1820), conspirator; George Daniel Ekarte (1896/7–1964), minister and community worker; Nathaniel Akinremi Fadipe (1893–1944), writer and anti-colonialist; Claudia Jones (1915–1964), communist and journalist; Ras Tomasa Makonnen (c. 1900–1983), political activist; and Henry Sylvester Williams (1869–1911), pan-Africanist.

In October 2022, Sherwood was awarded an Honorary Doctorate of History at the University of Chichester.

Sherwood died at home on 16 February 2025, at the age of 87.

== Selected publications ==
=== Books ===
- An African Family in Kent: The African Makaula-White Family in East Kent, RTP, 2025, ASIN B0DSCGRMK3
- Kwame Nkrumah and the Dawn of the Cold War: The West African National Secretariat, 1945-48 (Pluto, 2019).
- World War II: Colonies and Colonials, Savannah Press], 2013. ISBN 978-0951972076
- The Life and Times of Albert Makaula-White, an African Farmer in Kent 1904–1937, Savannah Press, 2012
  - Reviews:
- Malcolm X: Visits abroad April 1964 – February 1965, UK: Savannah Press, 2010, ISBN 978-0951972069; USA: Tsehai Publishers, 2011. ISBN 978-1599070506
- The Origins of Pan-Africanism: Henry Sylvester Williams and the African Diaspora, Routledge, 2010. ISBN 978-0415633239
  - Reviews:
- (with Kim Sherwood) Britain, the slave trade and slavery, from 1562 to the 1880s, Savannah Press, 2007. ISBN 978-0951972052
- After Abolition: Britain and the Slave Trade Since 1807, I.B. Tauris, 2007. ISBN 978-1845113650
- (with Hakim Adi) Pan-African History: political figures from Africa and the diaspora since 1787, Routledge, 2003. ISBN 978-0946918003
  - Reviews:
- Claudia Jones: a life in exile, Lawrence & Wishart, 2000. ISBN 978-0853158820
  - Review:
- Ernest Bowen and Printers' Trade Unions in British Guiana and Trinidad, 1927–1941,:Savannah Press, 1999. ISBN 978-0951972038
- (with Martin Spafford) Whose Freedom were Africans, Caribbeans and Indians fighting for in World War II?, Savannah Press/BASA, 1999. ISBN 978-0951972045
- Kwame Nkrumah: the Years Abroad 1935–1947, Freedom Publications (Ghana), 1996. ISBN 978-9988771607
  - Review:
- (with Hakim Adi) The 1945 Pan-African Congress Revisited, New Beacon Books, 1995. ISBN 978-1873201121
- Manchester and the 1945 Pan-African Congress, Savannah Press, 1995. ISBN 978-0951972021
- Pastor Daniels Ekarté and the African Churches Mission, Savannah Press, 1994. ISBN 978-0951972014
- (with Bob Rees) Black Peoples of the Americas, Heinemann, 1992. ISBN 978-0435314255
- Black Peoples in the Americas — a handbook for teachers, Savannah Press, 1992. ISBN 978-0951972007
- Women Under the Sun (African Women in Politics and Production — a bibliography), IFAA, London, 1988. ISBN 978-1870425056
- Many Struggles (West Indian Workers and Service Personnel in Britain 1939–1945), Karia Press, 1985. ISBN 978-0946918003
- The British Honduran Forestry Unit in Scotland, OC Publishers, 1982. ISBN 978-0907611028

=== Articles ===
On peoples of African and Asian origins / descent in the UK

- "The Multi-ethnic Royal Navy and Merchant Marine, from the Seventeenth Century Onward" Topmasts, #2, August 2018.
- "Two Pan-African political activists emanating from Edinburgh University: Drs John Randle and Richard Akinwande Savage", in Afe Adogame and Andrew Lawrence (eds), Africa in Scotland, Scotland in Africa (Leiden: Brill, 2014). ISBN 978-9004276208
- "Gordon Riots", Total Politics, June 2011.
- "Africans in Britain 2000 years ago", New African, October 2010.
- "Shall we ever learn the full story of Blacks in the Royal Navy?" BASA Newsletter, #57, 2010.
- "Krishna Menon, Parliamentary Labour Party Candidate for Dundee 1939–1940", Scottish Labour History Journal, vol. 42, 2007.
- "Lascar Struggles against discrimination in Britain 1923–1945: the work of N. J. Upadhyaya and Surat Alley", The Mariner’s Mirror, 90/4, 2004.
- "Riots, lynchings, fascists and immigrants: what’s changed?" Searchlight, October 2003.
- "Lascars in Glasgow and the West of Scotland during World War II", Scottish Labour History Journal, vol. 38, 2003.
- "Blacks in Tudor England", History Today, Volume 53, Issue 10, October 2003.
- "Lynching in Britain", History Today, 49/3 March 1999.
- "Blacks in the Gordon Riots", History Today, December 1997.
- "The Comintern, the CPGB, Colonies and Black Britons 1920 – 1938", Science & Society, Spring 1996.
- "Quakers and Colonials 1930–1950", Immigrants & Minorities, July 1991.
- "Racism and Resistance: Cardiff in the 1930s and ‘40s", Llafur (Welsh Labour History Journal), September 1991.
- "Race, Nationality and Employment among Lascar Seamen 1660 to 1945", New Community, January 1991.
- "Ticket of Leave", History Today, August 1990.
- "The War Against Blacks in Britain", Freedomways, 4th Quarter 1982.

On the trade in enslaved Africans, and slavery

- "'Legitimate' traders, the building of empires and the long-term after-effects in Africa", in T. Green (ed.), Brokers of Change: Atlantic Commerce and Cultures in Pre-Colonial Western Africa, British Academy/OUP, 2012.
- "Slavery: the Atlantic trade and Arab slavery", New African, October 2012.
- "The trade in enslaved Africans", in F. Brennan & John Parker, Colonialism, Slavery, Reparations and Trade: Remedying the ‘Past’, Taylor & Francis/Routledge, 2011.
- "The British illegal slave trade 1808 – 1830", British Journal for Eighteenth-Century Studies, 31/2, 2008.
- "Manchester, Liverpool and Slavery", North West Labour History Journal, #32, September 2007.
- "Slaves and slavery, 1807–2007: the past in the present", openDemocracy, 23 March 2007.
- "The Nefarious Trade", History Today, March 2007.
- "British companies continued to profit after abolition of slave trade", Socialist Worker, 24 March 2007.
- "Britain, the slave trade and slavery, 1808 – 1843", Race & Class 46/2, October–December 2004.
- "Perfidious Albion: Britain, the USA and slavery in the 1840s and 1860s", Contributions to Black Studies, 13/14 1995/6 (published 1999).

On Pan-Africanism / Kwame Nkrumah

- "The beginning of the Cold War in the Gold Coast?" in David Featherstone and Christian Hogsbjerg (eds), The Red and the Black: The Russian Revolution and the Black Atlantic (Manchester: Manchester University Press, 2021)
- "The All Colonial Peoples Conferences in Britain, 1945", Leeds African Studies Bulletin, 79 (2018).
- "The Quest in the United Kingdom for African Unity, 1945-48" Contemporary Journal of African Studies, 5/1, 2017
- "Nkrumah and Pan-Africanism 1942 – 1958", in Lazare Ki-Zerbo (ed.), Hands Off Africa (2013).
- "The Pan-African Conference, Kumasi, 1953", in T. Manuh and A. Sawyerr (eds), The Kwame Nkrumah Centenary Colloquium Proceedings, Accra: Kwame Nkrumah Centenary Committee, 2013.
- "George Padmore and Kwame Nkrumah: a tentative outline of their relationship" in Fitzroy Baptiste and Rupert Lewis (eds), George Padmore: Pan-African Revolutionary, Ian Randle Publications, 2009.
- "Pan-African Conferences, 1900 – 1953: what did Pan-Africanism mean?" In Charles Quist-Adade and Frances Chiang (eds), From Colonization to Globalization, Dayspring Publishing, 2011 /Journal of Pan-African Studies, 4/10, 2012.
- "Nkrumah: the Student: Years in London 1945–1947", Immigrants & Minorities, September, 1993.

On Africa / Africans

- "African Students Association of America and Canada, 1941 – 1945" The Lagos Historical Review, issue 14, 2015
- "The African Diaspora in Europe", in Encyclopaedia of the World’s Minorities, Routledge, 2006.
- "Jamaicans and Barbadians in the Province of Freedom: Sierra Leone 1802–1841", Caribbean Studies, 13/2–3, 1998.
- "Elder Dempster and West Africa 1891 – 1940: the genesis of underdevelopment", International Journal of African Historical Studies, 30/3, 1997.
- "'There is no new deal for the blackman in San Francisco': African attempts to influence the founding conference of the United Nations April – July 1945", International Journal of African Historical Studies, 29/1, 1996.
- "Strikes! African Seamen, Elder Dempster and the Government, 1940–1942", Immigrants & Minorities, July 1994.

On education

- "Racism by omission", History Extra, BBC History, 29 December 2009.
- "Have we progressed since the Lawrence Enquiry?", Summer issue, Race Equality Teaching, 27/3, 2009.
- "Miseducation and Racism", Ethnicity and Race in a Changing World: A Review Journal, February 2009.
- "Black School Teachers in Britain in the Eighteenth and Nineteenth Centuries", History of Education Researcher, #.81, May 2008.
- "Teaching Black history: the struggle continues", Institute of Race Relations (November 2007).
- "'There is so much more to the history of Black peoples than slavery...'", Race Equality Teaching, 25/2, 2007.
- "Racism in Education?", Race Equality Teaching, 22/3, Summer 2004.
- "Race, Empire and Education: teaching racism", Race & Class 42/3, 2001.
- "Education and the Lawrence Inquiry", Multicultural Teaching, 18/2, 2000.
- "Engendering racism: history and history teachers in English schools", Research in African Literatures, 30/1, February 1999.
- "Sins of omission and commission: history in English schools and struggles for change", Multicultural Teaching, Spring 1998,
- "The Dangers of Ethnocentrism", Teaching History, January 1996,
- "SOS: Is Anybody Listening?", Teaching History, June 1994.

On racism

- "White Myths, Black Omissions: the historical origins of racism in Britain", International Journal of Historical Teaching, Learning and Research, 3/1, January 2003.
- "It's Not a Question of Racism; a case study of institutional racism 1941–1943", Immigrants & Minorities, July 1985.

Other

- "William G. Allen in Britain", Ethnicity and Race in a Changing World, vol. 2, issue 2, winter/spring 2011. https://ercw.openlibrary.manchester.ac.uk/index.php/ercw/article/download/57/53
- (with Kathy Chater), "The Pigou Family Across Three Continents", Proceedings of the Huguenot Society, 28/3, 2005.
- "Malcolm X in Manchester, 1964", North West History Journal, #27, 2002.
- "India at the Founding of the United Nations", International Studies (India), 33/4, 1996.
- "The UN: Caribbean and African-American attempts to influence the founding conference in San Francisco, 1945", Journal of Caribbean History, 29/1, 1996.
- "'Diplomatic Platitudes': the Atlantic Charter, the United Nations and colonial independence", Immigrants and Minorities, September 1996.
- "Walter White and the British: a lost opportunity", Contributions to Black Studies, Nos. 9/10, 1990–1992.
