= Sunara Begum =

English visual artist and filmmaker (born 1984)

- সুনারা বেগম
- Born: 22 September 1984 (age 42); London, England
- Education: Camberwell College of Arts; Central St Martins College of Art and Design
- Occupations: Visual and performance artist, filmmaker, photographer, writer, producer, director, co-founder, actress, stage design
- Years active: 2002–present
- Style: Visual-Anthro-Mythologist
- Spouse: Tunde Jegede (m. 2012)
- Website: sunarabegum.com

Sunara Begum (Bengali: সুনারা বেগম; born 22 September 1984) is an English visual and performance artist, filmmaker, photographer and writer of Bangladeshi descent.

== Early life ==
Begum was born in London, England, and is of Bangladeshi descent. She grew up in a Sufi Muslim household.

She studied at Camberwell College of Arts. In 2008, she graduated from Central Saint Martins College of Art and Design with a Bachelor of Fine Arts and a Master of Fine Arts. During her studies, she worked as an archivist for the Henry Moore Foundation and as a research assistant, camera operator, and line producer for Halaqah Media.

== Career ==
=== Art ===
Begum held her first exhibition in 2004 at the National Annexe Gallery in Cape Town, South Africa, while still a student at Central Saint Martins. She has since presented solo exhibitions at Whitespace Gallery (2016, Nigeria), Dimbola Museum & Gallery (2016, UK), Lionel Wendt Gallery (2015, Sri Lanka), Centre for Contemporary Art (2015, Nigeria), St Martin-in-the-Fields (2012, 2014, UK), Drik Gallery (2011, Bangladesh), and 198 Gallery (2010, UK).

She has collaborated with multimedia artist Trevor Mathison, spoken word artist HKB FiNN, composer Tunde Jegede, and choreographer Bode Lawal.

In 2010 she exhibited Ara: A New Face of the Old World at the 198 Gallery in London.

As a photographer, her work has appeared in publications in France, the UK, China, India, and Bangladesh, including Songlines and Le Monde. In September 2010 she published her first book, The Legend of Ara, a photographic narrative of a mythical character.

=== Film ===
Begum has also been involved in theatre productions, film and television. She has worked as a producer and cinematographer on several films, including The Idea and the award-winning feature film 500 Years Later. She directed her own debut short film, Ara's Sojourn, to critical acclaim. This featured her sister, Shahanara Begum.

== Filmography ==
=== Film ===
| Year | Title | Credit |
|---|---|---|
| 2002 | Justice for the Youth | Research, camera operator |
| 2005 | 500 Years Later | Research, administration |
| 2006 | The Idea | Producer, production manager |
| 2007 | Our Story Our Voice | Presenter, camera operator |
| 2007 | Ara's Sojourn | Director, producer, editor |
| 2008 | Ara's World | Director, writer |
| 2009 | Menantol | Editor |
| 2010 | Ara Trilogy | Director |
| 2010 | The World of Tunde Jegede | Director |
| 2011 | The Water's Will | Director |
| 2012 | Visions of a Traveler | Director |
| 2013 | Truth & Art | Director, producer |
| 2013 | The Pilgrim Within | Director |
| 2014 | Night Paintings | Director, editor |
| 2015 | New Horizons Africa | Producer |
| 2016 | New Horizons Africa | Producer |
| 2017 | Memories of My Mentor | Director, producer, writer, editor |
| 2019 | Water | Director, producer, writer, editor |

== Novels, CD & DVD ==
| Year | Title | Publisher / Production | ISBN / Catalogue No. |
|---|---|---|---|
| 2010 | The Legend of Ara | Chand Aftara Publishing | ISBN 978-0956694607 |
| 2013 | Truth & Art | Chand Aftara Production | CA001 |
| 2015 | New Horizons Africa: New Horizons | Chand Aftara Production | CA002 |
| 2015 | New Horizons Africa: African Messiah | Chand Aftara Production | CA003 |
| 2015 | New Horizons Africa: Testimony | Chand Aftara Production | CA004 |
| 2016 | New Horizons Africa: Resistance & Revelation | Chand Aftara Production | CA005 |
| 2016 | New Horizons Africa: New Worlds | Chand Aftara Production | CA006 |
| 2016 | New Horizons Africa: African Ballet | Chand Aftara Production | CA007 |
| 2017 | Who Am I | Chand Aftara Production | CA008 |

== See also ==
- British Bangladeshi
- List of British Bangladeshis
