= Samassékou =

Samassékou is a Malian surname. Notable people with the surname include:

- Adama Samassékou (1946-2024), government minister of Mali
- Diadie Samassékou (born 1996), Malian football midfielder
- Fatoumata Samassékou (born 1987), Malian swimmer
