= LGBTQ rights in the Gambia =

LGBT rights

- The Gambia
- Legal status: Illegal
- Penalty: Imprisonment for term of up to life imprisonment
- Gender identity: No
- Military: No
- Discrimination protections: None

Family rights
- Recognition of relationships: No
- Adoption: No

Lesbian, gay, bisexual, transgender, and queer (LGBTQ) people in the Gambia face significant challenges not experienced by non-LGBTQ residents. Same-sex sexual activity is illegal for both men and women in the Gambia. Criminalisation commenced under the colonial rule of the British. The 1933 Criminal Code provides penalties of prison terms of up to fourteen years. In 2014, the country amended its code to impose even harsher penalties of life imprisonment for "aggravated" cases. The gender expression of transgender individuals is also legally restricted in the country. While the United States Department of State reports that the laws against homosexual activity are rarely enforced, arrests have occurred; the NGO Human Rights Watch reports regular organised actions by law enforcement against persons suspected of homosexuality and gender non-conformity.

Anti-gay rhetoric has been expressed by leaders— notably Yahya Jammeh, the president until 2017. This has contributed to a hostile environment for LGBTQ persons, who are subject to official and societal harassment and abuses. There are laws against men dressing as women, effectively discriminating against transgender women. The Gambia makes no provision for any official change of gender for its citizens and has no discrimination protections in place. Statements from government sources, including the current president Adama Barrow indicate there are no plans for any liberalisation of laws regarding homosexuality. However, his government promised not to prosecute same-sex couples for consensual sexual acts.

== Laws on same-sex sexual activity ==
The criminalisation of same-sex sexual conduct began in Gambia's colonial era, when it was under British control as the Gambia Colony and Protectorate. The colonial Criminal Code (1933) of Gambia was implemented in 1934; its provisions, proscribing consensual sexual activity between males as "carnal knowledge against the order of nature" have remained in force to the present. (Note: Relevant provisions of Chapter XV of The Gambia Criminal Code (Act No. 25 of 1933), as amended by the Criminal Code (Amendment) Act, 2005, are: §144: "Unnatural offences" (1) Any person who (a) has carnal knowledge of any person against the order of nature; or [...] (c) permits any person to have carnal knowledge of him or her against the order of nature; is guilty of a felony, and is liable to imprisonment for a term of 14 years. (2) In this section — "carnal knowledge of any person against the order of nature" includes: (a) carnal knowledge of the person through the anus or the mouth of the person; (b) inserting any object or thing into the vulva or the anus of the person for the purpose of simulating sex; and (c) committing any other homosexual act with the person. [§145: Any person who attempts to commit any of the offenses specified in Section 144 is guilty of a felony and is liable to imprisonment for a term of seven years.] [...] §147: "Indecent practices" (1) Any male person who, whether in public or private, commits an "act of gross indecency" with another male person or procures another male person to commit an act of this kind with him, or attempts to procure another male person to commit such an act with himself or another male person, is guilty of a misdemeanour and liable to imprisonment for a term of five years. (2) Any female person who, whether in public or private, commits an "act of gross indecency" with another female person or procures another female person to commit an act of this kind with her, or attempts to procure another female person to commit such an act with herself or another female person, is guilty of a misdemeanour and liable to imprisonment for a term of five years. (3) The term "act of gross indecency" includes any homosexual act.) Amendments to the code have included changes to criminalise sexual behavior between women as "gross indecency" by the Criminal Code (Amendment) Act, 2005, and 2014 provisions dealing with "aggravated" homosexual offences that attract higher penalties, including the possibility of life imprisonment.

=== "Aggravated" offences ===
The Criminal Code (Amendment) Act 2014 introduced the crime of "aggravated homsexuality", which applies to "serial offenders" and gay or lesbian people living with HIV, carrying a mandatory life sentence. President Jammeh signed the bill into law on October 2014 without making a public announcement. The law defines "aggravated homosexuality" to include sexual acts with persons of the same gender under 18 years of age, disabled persons, drugged persons, or where the accused is a parent or a guardian, as well as an authority figure.

Homosexual acts remain criminalised under Section 158 of the Criminal Code, punishable by up to 14 years imprisonment for both men and women (amended in 2005 to include women).

=== Gender identity and expression ===
The Gambia does not allow citizens to change their legal gender. Since 2013, the country has restricted freedom of gender expression under section 167 of the Criminal Code, which forbids men to dress "as women"; cross-dressing is punishable by up to 5 years in jail or a fine of 50,000 Gambian dalasi.

=== Discrimination protections ===
The Gambia has no law or regulation in place for protection of residents against discrimination based on sexual orientation or gender identity.

=== Enforcement ===
Arrests of gay people are believed to have been common during Jammeh's presidency, but there is a lack of data to confirm this. The Truth, Reconciliation and Reparations Commission attempts to make an impartial record of human rights abuses committed while Jammeh was in office. However, safety concerns among LGBT+ Gambians likely prevents then from giving their testimony. The commisson's deputy executive secretrary Musu Bakoto Sawo says that there is "a high probability of victims not coming out."

In June 2008, two Spanish men in their 50s, alleged to be gay, were arrested by Gambian police and detained at Kotu police station. "According to ... sources, the Spanish contacted two taxi drivers and asked to be taken to where they can meet with homosexuals, saying they were willing to pay any amount, which the drivers agreed. The sources further said the drivers asked the Spanish to wait, that they were going to search for homosexuals. When they left, the men changed their minds and decided to contact the police at the Kotu Police Station, who arrested the Spanish." The men were subsequently released, reportedly after the Spanish government intervened.

On 23 December 2008, Frank Boers, a 79-year-old man from the Netherlands, was arrested at Banjul International Airport when officials found him in possession of pornography, including nude pictures of himself and some Gambian men. A Banjul court found Boers guilty of indecency with those men and sentenced him to pay 100,000 Gambian dalasis (£2,500) in lieu of a two-year prison sentence. After the sentencing, Boers told the prosecutor that he would prefer prison to the fine because he had no means to pay the fine.

On 10 April 2012, a court remanded in custody 18 purportedly homosexual men who were arrested on 9 April at a bar in the Tourism Development Area. The men — 16 from Senegal, one from the Gambia, and one from Nigeria — were charged with "indecent practice among themselves at a public place". According to police testimony in court in July 2012, the arrests were made because men were "wearing women's clothes", carrying handbags, and "walking like ladies". On 1 August 2012, the prosecutor dropped all charges in the case.

In November 2014, state forces launched a homosexuality investigation following the enactment of the aggravated homosexuality law, leading to at least eight arrests. At least four adult men, a 17-year-old boy, and nine women were apprehended on allegations of aggravated homosexual conduct. Detainees were confined at the National Intelligence Agency's headquarters in Banjul and allegedly subjected to torture and ill-treatment to compel confessions. Three more men were arrested and interrogated for homosexual activity in December 2014.

In March 2026, Muhammad Jawo and Muhammad Krubally were each sentenced to five years of imprisonment for engaging in sexual activity in an unfinished building. Magistrate Isatou Jallow of the Brusubi Magistrates' Court declared them guilty of violating Section 147(1) of the Criminal Code for indecent conduct between men.

== Family and relationship policy ==
=== Recognition of same-sex relationships ===
Same-sex couples have no legal recognition.

=== Adoption ===
The Gambia prohibits LGBTQ people from adopting children.

== Living conditions ==
Gambian society is conservative with strict religious and traditional beliefs. Children are raised within male and female gender norms. Not conforming to the expected heterosexual norm is seen as deviant and taboo. The country's media promotes misinformation, harmful stereotypes, and violence towards LGBTQ+ people. A survey conducted from 2021 to 2023 found that 93% of Gambians would dislike or strongly dislike having a homosexual neighbor.

The U.S. Department of State's 2011 Human Rights Report found that "there was strong societal discrimination against LGBTQ individuals, some of whom were shunned", although "there were no reported incidents of physical violence against LGBTQ individuals during the year".

After President Jammeh lost power to President Adama Barrow in 2016, life remained difficult for LGBTQ+ people in the country. There are no LGBTQ+ organizations as it is considered too dangerous. Many LGBTQ+ Gambians fear getting arrested or killed and flee to other countries. Religious leaders in the country are widely opposed to LGBTQ+ rights with some calling for LGBTQ+ people to be killed.

In 2023, there were reports of healthcare workers refusing to honor LGBTQ+ people's privacy which has negatively impacted healthcare for human immunodeficiency virus (HIV). LGBTQ+ Gambians have reported experiencing employment discrimination as well. There were no reported incidents of conversion therapy being performed on LGBTQ+ people. There were also no reported incidents of surgeries on intersex children or nonconsenting adults to conform their bodies to expected norms.

== Political stances ==
=== 2008–2017 ===
Former Gambian President Yahya Jammeh said in May 2008 that laws "stricter than those in Iran" against homosexuals would soon be introduced and vowed to "cut off the head" of any homosexual caught in the country. On 15 May 2008, Jammeh gave homosexuals 24 hours to leave the country. He also commanded "all those who harbour such individuals to kick them out of their compounds, noting that a mass patrol will be conducted on the instructions of the [Inspector General of Police] ... and the director of the Gambia Immigration Department to weed bad elements in society". He said, "Any hotel, lodge[,] or motel that lodges this kind of individuals will be closed down, because this act is unlawful. We are in a Muslim dominated country and I will not and shall never accept such individuals in this country".

President Jammeh said in a speech before newly promoted army chiefs on 7 December 2009, "We will not encourage lesbianism and homosexuality in the military. It is a taboo in our armed forces. I will sack any soldier suspected of being a gay or lesbian in the Gambia. We need no gays in our armed forces." Jammeh advised the army chiefs to monitor the activities of their men and deal with soldiers bent on practicing lesbianism in the military. In 2015, Jammeh said while celebrating his 20th year in office that "we will fight these vermins called homosexuals or gays the same way we are fighting malaria-causing mosquitoes, if not more aggressively."

=== Current leaders ===
President of the Gambia since 2017 Adama Barrow, commented on LGBTQ rights early in his presidency, saying that "homosexuality is not an issue in Gambia"; these less inflammatory comments than those regularly voiced by Jammeh, have been interpreted as displaying less hostility to the LGBTQ community. LGBTQ community members expressed their hope this indicated that improved conditions for them compared to those under the previous regime. A speech Barrow gave on a visit to the European Union in 2020 was reported to have caused alarmed reactions in the Gambia, by appearing to some constituents as too conciliatory towards the LGBTQ community and pro-LGBTQ rights. The president's officials played down any implication that the government would move to improve LGBTQ rights.

== Summary table ==
Same-sex sexual activity legal	No Penalty: up to life in prison
Equal age of consent	No
Anti-discrimination laws in employment only	No
Anti-discrimination laws in the provision of goods and services	No
Anti-discrimination laws in all other areas (Incl. indirect discrimination, hate speech)	No
Same-sex marriages	No
Recognition of same-sex couples	No
Step-child adoption by same-sex couples	No
Joint adoption by same-sex couples	No
Gays and lesbians allowed to serve openly in the military	No
Right to change legal gender	No
Unrestricted gender expression	No It is illegal for men to dress as women
Access to IVF for lesbians	No
Commercial surrogacy for gay male couples	No
MSMs allowed to donate blood	No

== See also ==
- Human rights in the Gambia
- LGBTQ rights in Africa
