= Hakim Adi =

British historian and scholar

Professor Hakim Adi
- Occupations: Historian, scholar and writer
- Known for: Pan-Africanism
- Title: Professor of History of Africa and the African Diaspora
- Awards: ASAUK Outstanding African Studies Award, 2024

Academic background
- Education: SOAS University of London

Academic work
- Notable works: Pan-Africanism: A History (2018); African and Caribbean People in Britain: A History (2022)
- Website: www.hakimadi.org

Hakim Adi is a British historian and scholar who specialises in African affairs. He was the first African-British historian to become a professor of history in the UK when in 2015 he was appointed Professor of the History of Africa and the African Diaspora at the University of Chichester, launching in 2018 the world's first online MRes in the History of Africa and the African Diaspora.

He has written widely on Pan-Africanism and the modern political history of Africa and the African diaspora, including the 2018 book Pan-Africanism: A History. Adi is an advocate of the education curriculum including the history of Africa and its diaspora. In 2024, he was awarded the ASAUK Outstanding African Studies Award, in recognition of his "commitment to amplifying marginalised voices within historical narratives, thereby empowering contemporary African communities."

== Career ==
Adi has spoken of his motivation for becoming a historian of Africa and the African diaspora being that he wanted to research and teach a subject that had been denied to him. In 1976, he began studying at the School of Oriental and African Studies (SOAS), London University, where he obtained a BA and eventually in 1994 his PhD in African history. He has described himself as "a late developer into higher education.... I've taught history at every level you can imagine: schools, prison, adult education, further education, university. I've taught in Broadmoor, Strangeways — you name it, I've done it...". He was Reader in the History of Africa and the African Diaspora at Middlesex University for many years until the department of history was closed down. In 2012, he took up an appointment at the University of Chichester, West Sussex, lecturing in African History and is one of the few African British academics to become recognised as a professor. He supervised the master of research thesis of the Nigerian human rights activist Ibrahim B. Anoba at the University of Chichester in 2020.

Adi was a founder member in 1991 of the Black and Asian Studies Association (BASA), which he chaired for several years.

He also leads the History Matters group, a collection of academics and teachers concerned with the under-representation of students and teachers of African and Caribbean heritage within the History discipline. In 2015, the group convened the conference entitled "History Matters" that was held at the Institute of Historical Research.

He is a founder of the Young Historians Project, a non-profit organisation working encourage young historians of African and Caribbean heritage in Britain, which developed out of the History Matters initiative.

Adi was in conversation with David Olusoga at the British Library on 4 November 2022.

In August 2023, Adi delivered the annual Dorothy Kuya Slavery Remembrance Memorial Lecture for National Museums Liverpool, addressing the theme of combatting racism through transformative education.

In 2024, Adi was awarded the ASAUK Outstanding African Studies Award, with the citation stating: "Professor Adi's scholarship has significantly advanced our understanding of African and African Diaspora history, elucidating the intricate dynamics of anti-colonial movements, Pan-Africanist initiatives, and the experiences of individuals of African descent worldwide. His work is characterised by rigorous research, interdisciplinary analysis, and a commitment to amplifying marginalised voices within historical narratives, thereby empowering contemporary African communities."

=== Chichester University's closure of Master's by Research (MRes) course ===
In May 2023, the Master's by Research (MRes) course in the history of Africa and the African diaspora, which Adi founded in 2017, came under threat of closure by Chichester University, with the proposed redundancy of Adi on the grounds that the course had recruited only "a relatively small number of students". Noting that the course is the only one of its kind in Europe "and was one of the recommendations of the History Matters conference in 2015 supported by the University of Chichester", Adi was reported in The Voice as saying: "All the evidence we have is that the course is badly needed. It has produced 6 current PhD students for the university and could produce even more if adequately advertised. It has recruited and has support in Britain, North America, Africa and the Caribbean and even Asia." The threatened cut was described by the University and College Union as an "attack on black academia".

A public petition against Adi's redundancy and suspension of recruitment for the course was started in July 2023, quickly winning support from more than 10,000 signatories. Adi further commented: "At Chichester we have 16 black postgraduate history students....Now those students have lost their supervisor. The university has no suitable person, no specialist in the history of Africa and the African diaspora, to supervise those students."

The Royal Historical Society, which in 2018 published the report Race, Ethnicity & Equality in UK History that highlighted racial and ethnic inequalities in the teaching and practice of History in the UK, said in a statement dated 12 September 2023: "The President and Council of the Royal Historical Society are extremely disappointed and concerned by the University of Chichester's recent decision to terminate its MRes in the History of Africa and the African Diaspora. This action also sees the redundancy of Professor Hakim Adi, the course leader and a prominent UK contributor to the understanding and communication of Black British history. News of Professor Adi's redundancy came a week before inclusion of his latest book, African and Caribbean People in Britain: A History, on the 2023 Wolfson Prize shortlist....With its decision, the University of Chichester goes against initiatives that seek to build an infrastructure for teaching and researching Black British History—one that's accessible to students of diverse backgrounds across the UK."

== Writings ==
Adi has written and published widely on Pan-Africanism and on the history of the African diaspora, particularly Africans in Britain. He is the author of several books, among them West Africans in Britain 1900–1960: Nationalism, Pan-Africanism and Communism (1998), Pan-Africanism and Communism: The Communist International, Africa and the Diaspora, 1919–1939 (2013), African and Caribbean People in Britain (2022), and he is the joint author (with Marika Sherwood) of The 1945 Manchester Pan-African Congress Revisited (1995) and Pan-African History: Political Figures from Africa and the Diaspora since 1787 (2003). Adi has also written history books for children, including The History of the African and Caribbean Communities in Britain (2005).

Adi's 2018 work, Pan-Africanism: A History, was characterised by Nigerian historian and professor Toyin Falola as "an eminently readable book full of crucial and cogent ideas on the most significant phases in the historical development of Pan-Africanism from its earliest inception to the most recent transition to the African Union." Adom Getachew wrote in The Nation in 2019: "Few scholars are better positioned than Adi to chart Pan-Africanism’s history: Over the course of two decades, he has chronicled it and the modern black experience more broadly as the writer or editor of 11 books, not to mention many journal articles and chapters written for other books. In Pan-Africanism, he brings to bear his encyclopedic knowledge of black freedom movements in Africa, the Americas, and Europe."

Adi's 2022 book African and Caribbean People in Britain: A History was described in The Observer by academic Kehinde Andrews as "his crowning achievement; a meticulously researched tour de force that charts black presence on the British Isles from Cheddar Man through the African Roman legions and Black Tudors and into the present day. ... Adi's work should represent the final nail in the coffin for those who think that Britain was ever truly white and should be kept that way. Onyekachi Wambu said: "African and Caribbean People in Britain: A History is a magnificent publication", while Gretchen Gerzina wrote in a review of the book for The Times Literary Supplement: "Adi's project is a comprehensive social and political history that stretches from recent discoveries concerning inhabitants of Roman Britain all the way through to the advent of the Black Lives Matter movement, the Grenfell Tower fire and the Guardian's coverage of the Windrush Scandal."

African and Caribbean People in Britain: A History was shortlisted for the 2023 Wolfson History Prize. The judging panel (comprising Mary Beard, Sudhir Hazareesingh, Richard Evans, Carole Hillenbrand, Diarmaid MacCulloch, and chair David Cannadine) described Adi's work as "[a] comprehensive history of African and Caribbean people in Britain and the vital role they played in the struggle for equality. An epic narrative and a timely book."

Books that Adi has edited include Black British History: New Perspectives (2019), which collects together 11 essays that reveal neglected histories of the African diaspora in Britain from the middle ages to the 20th century. His most recent publication as editor is 2023's Many Struggles: New Histories of African and Caribbean People in Britain (Pluto Press), about which Ama Biney, lecturer in Black British history at the University of Liverpool, has said: "This valuable book enriches our understanding of the contribution of African and Caribbean people across British cities and towns from the 17th century to contemporary times, as well as their transnational connections and commitments to the Caribbean and Africa."

== Film work ==
Hakim Adi featured (alongside Maulana Karenga, Muhammed Shareef, Francis Cress Welsin, Kimani Nehusi, Paul Robeson Jr, and Nelson George) in the multi-award-winning documentary 500 Years Later (2005), written by M. K. Asante Jr. and directed by Owen 'Alik Shahadah.

== Recognition and awards ==
- 2023: Wolfson History Prize shortlist for African and Caribbean People in Britain: A History
- 2024: ASAUK Outstanding African Studies Award

== Selected bibliography ==
=== Books ===
- African Migrations, Thomson Learning, 1994. ISBN 978-1568472386
- With Marika Sherwood, The 1945 Manchester Pan-African Congress Revisited, London: New Beacon Books, 1995. ISBN 978-1873201121
- West Africans in Britain 1900–1960: Nationalism, Pan-Africanism and Communism, London: Lawrence & Wishart, 1998. ISBN 978-0853158486
- With Marika Sherwood, Pan-African History: Political Figures from Africa and the Diaspora since 1787, London/New York: Routledge: 2003. ISBN 978-0415173537
- The History of the African and Caribbean Communities in Britain, Wayland, 2005. ISBN 978-0750247351. Paperback 2014, ISBN 978-0750290616
- Co-editor with Caroline Bressey, Belonging in Europe – The African Diaspora and Work, London: Routledge, 2010. ISBN 978-0415846219
- Pan-Africanism and Communism: The Communist International, Africa and the Diaspora, 1919–1939, Trenton, New Jersey, USA: Africa World Press, 2013. ISBN 978-1592219162
- Pan-Africanism: A History, Bloomsbury Academic, 2018. ISBN 978-1474254274
- As editor, Black British History: New Perspectives, Zed Books, 2019, ISBN 9781786994264
- African and Caribbean People in Britain: A History, Allen Lane, 2022. ISBN 978-0241583821
- As editor, Black Voices on Britain, Macmillan, 2022, ISBN 9781529072617
- As editor, Many Struggles: New Histories of African and Caribbean People in Britain, Pluto Press, 2023, ISBN 9780745347653.

=== Articles ===
- "A New Kind of Imperialism", Radical History Review, Issue 95: "New Imperialisms", Spring 2006. Workers' Daily Internet Edition.
- "London, slavery and abolition", BBC, 2007.
- "The wider historical context of the abolition of the transatlantic slave trade", Pambazuka News, Issue 302, 2 May 2007.
- "George Padmore and the 1945 Manchester Pan-African Congress", in Fitzroy Baptiste and Rupert Lewis (eds), George Padmore: Pan-African Revolutionary, Kingston, JA: Ian Randle, 2009.
- "To What Extent is Britain Post-Colonial?", E-International Relations, 3 October 2012.
- "The New Scramble for Africa", E-International Relations, 15 April 2013.
- "Britain’s black history has been shamefully whitewashed" (review of Black and British: A Forgotten History by David Olusoga), The Spectator, 14 January 2017.
