= Black and Asian Studies Association =

UK-based research and education organisation

The Black and Asian Studies Association (BASA) was set up in London in 1990. Until October 1997 it was known as the Association for the Study of African, Caribbean and Asian Culture and History In Britain (ASACACHIB).

Founder members who attended the inaugural meeting at the Institute of Commonwealth Studies at 27–28 Russell Square on 4 December 1990 (verified in Stephen Bourne's diary and his copy of the list of invitees) include Stephen Bourne, Jeffrey Green, David Killingray, Marika Sherwood and Hakim Adi. The Association was set up to foster research and to provide information on the history of Black peoples in Britain. This has been done through a triannual Newsletter – first published in September 1991 – and an annual conference. They have also worked with local organisations to highlight the Black presence in British society.

BASA has lobbied government departments and quangoes, such as:

- English Heritage – blue plaques
- Qualifications and Curriculum Authority - school curriculum
- Museums, Libraries and Archives Council (formerly Resource) regarding archives, libraries and museums.

Other work involves specific projects with other organisations, including:

- CASBAH: a pilot website providing research resources relating to Caribbean Studies and the history of Black and Asian peoples in the UK.
- The National Archives' website on the history of Black peoples in Britain since the mid-16th century.
