= Tunde Jegede =

British-Nigerian composer (born 1972)

- Born: 28 January 1972 (age 54); London, England
- Education: Purcell School of Music, Guildhall School of Music
- Occupations: Composer, producer, cellist, kora player
- Years active: 1976–present
- Organization: Xiom Music
- Style: African classical music
- Spouse: Sunara Begum (m. 2012)
- Parent(s): Emmanuel Taiwo Jegede and Galina Chester
- Relatives: Sona Jobarteh (sister)
- Website: tundejegede.org

Tunde Jegede (born 28 January 1972) is a composer and multi-instrumentalist in contemporary classical, African and pop music, who is of Nigerian descent and born in England and as a child travelled to Africa to learn the art of the kora. An alumnus of the Purcell School, he is known for his blending of African and Western classical traditions in his work. He is a producer-songwriter and has worked across several genres both as a performer (cello, kora, piano and percussion) and producer. He is a master kora player, and specializes in the West African classical music tradition, which dates from the period of Sundiata. His sister is Sona Jobarteh, who is the first female kora virtuoso to come from a griot family. His father is Nigerian artist Emmanuel Taiwo Jegede.

== Life and career ==
Tunde Jegede was born in London, England, in 1972 to a Nigerian father and English mother (of Irish descent – the painter/filmmaker Galina Chester). His father Emmanuel Taiwo Jegede was artist-in-residence at North London's Keskidee Centre, Britain's first Black Arts Centre, where Tunde's appreciation of African diasporic culture was initiated and nurtured. From an early age, he was exposed to resident and visiting artists who worked in a multi-disciplinary mode, including Bob Marley, Walter Rodney, Edward Brathwaite, Angela Davis and Linton Kwesi Johnson. It was at Keskidee that Jegede's path as an artist began.

Jegede's apprenticeship in African music began in 1978 and was further developed in 1982 when he first went to The Gambia to study the ancient griot tradition of West Africa, with Amadu Bansang Jobarteh, Master of the Kora (West African harp-lute). The Jobarteh family are one of five principal musician families within this hereditary oral tradition, which dates back to at least the 13th century. Jegede's appreciation of Western Classical music began with his grandfather's love of Bach and by observing his work as a church organist.

Jegede also studied cello from the age of eight, and over the years was taught by people from the Classical world, including Alfia Bekova, Elma de Bruyne, Joan Dickson and Raphael Wallfisch at the Purcell School and later the Guildhall School of Music.

In 1988, Jegede became fascinated with jazz and worked and toured with ex-members of the Jazz Warriors founded by Courtney Pine and Cleveland Watkiss. Jegede formed his own jazz ensemble, The Jazz Griots, with the purpose of exploring the connections between African and African diasporic forms of music.

In 1991, he pioneered African Classical music in the UK with a national tour of the African Classical Music Ensemble, which nurtured his burgeoning composer credentials.

In 1995, a BBC TV documentary called Africa I Remember was made about Jegede's music and focused on his orchestral work. In this programme, he performed new compositions alongside the London Sinfonietta, which was conducted by Markus Stenz.

With his now fully-fledged composer credentials, Jegede was appointed as innovations composer for the Eastern Orchestral Board, who facilitated his working with many of the major orchestras in the UK, including the Royal Philharmonic Orchestra, the Philharmonia, Britten Sinfonia, Viva Sinfonia, the London Mozart Players and the Bournemouth Symphony Orchestra. All these orchestras and ensembles were keen to play his original compositions. During this period, he was specially commissioned to write a percussion concerto for Evelyn Glennie and Double Orchestra, an oratorio for the city of Milton Keynes and a string quartet for the Brodsky Quartet as a part of their Beethoven Op. 18 recording, which was released on the Vanguard label and is still being performed by them worldwide.

Over the years, Jegede has kept his creative diversity intact by working closely with singers, vocalists, and spoken-word artists from a wide range of traditions, including opera, pop, R'n'B, reggae, hip hop, and jazz. In 2002, he started ACM Productions with the primary goal of creating accessible quality productions across a small spectrum of genres, namely: Urban, Pop, Classical and jazz.

== Cultural influences ==
Born to a Nigerian father and Irish mother, Jegede learned to balance cultures and carve out an identity for himself from an early age. Music was his refuge. Leaving England as a child, he travelled to Africa to train with master of kora Amadu Bansang Jobarteh, whose family has held the ancient griot tradition since the 13th century. Here, Jegede found a sense of home and belonging, a place "where my inner and outer voice began to merge". He was shown that music is a way of life, an integral part of society. In parallel to studying kora, Jegede also studied cello in the Western classical tradition, but played these instruments in isolation from each other. Only later, after a quest for a universal truth in music that took him through improvisational jazz and musical collaboration, did he finally find the space that allowed him to weave together all his musical threads. He says: "Living between worlds allowed me to form my identity, embrace my path of a nomad."

== Discography ==
=== Albums ===
- 1995: Lamentation
- 1996: Malian Royal Court Music
- 2007: Still Moment
- 2009: There Was a Time
- 2009: How Many Prophets
- 2014: Heritage
- 2014: Testimony
- 2014: The Elements
- 2015: Mali in Oak with Derek Gripper
- 2018: The Emidy Project
- 2024: Voyages of the Heart

=== Soundtracks ===
- 2001: Hopes on the Horizon
- 2005: 500 Years Later
- 2006: Tunde
- 2013: Truth & Art

== Filmography ==
Jegede is known for the score of 500 Years Later, directed by Owen 'Alik Shahadah, as well as the score of PBS production Hopes on the Horizon. In 2006, Jegede co-wrote the short film The Idea. He composed the score for Mami Wata, the 2023 black-and-white fantasy thriller film written and directed by C.J. "Fiery" Obasi, based on West African folklore.

== Bibliography ==
- with Galina Chester, Silenced Voice: Hidden Music of the Kora, Diabate Kora Arts, 1987. ISBN 978-0951209301
- African Classical Music: The Griot Tradition. Diabate Arts, 1994, ISBN 978-0951209318.
