= Kwanzaa =

Annual African-American celebration

- Seven candles in a kinara symbolize the seven principles of Kwanzaa.
- Observed by: African Americans, parts of the African diaspora
- Type: Cultural and ethnic
- Significance: Celebrates African heritage, unity, and culture
- Celebrations: Unity; Creativity; Faith; Giving gifts
- Date: December 26 to January 1
- Related to: Pan-Africanism

Kwanzaa (/ˈkwɑːnzə/) is an annual celebration of African-American culture from December 26 to January 1, culminating in a communal feast called Karamu, usually on the sixth day. It was created by activist Maulana Karenga based on Karenga's research of African harvest festival traditions from various parts of West, East, and Southeast Africa. Kwanzaa was first celebrated in 1966. A 2009 estimate placed the number of Americans who celebrate Kwanzaa between 500,000 and 2,000,000.

== History and etymology ==
American black separatist Maulana Karenga created Kwanzaa in 1966 during the aftermath of the Watts riots as a non-Christian, specifically African-American holiday. Karenga said his goal was to "give black people an alternative to the existing holiday of Christmas and give black people an opportunity to celebrate themselves and their history, rather than simply imitate the practice of the dominant society." For Karenga, a figure in the Black Power movement of the 1960s and 1970s, the creation of such holidays also underscored the essential premise that "you must have a cultural revolution before the violent revolution. The cultural revolution gives identity, purpose, and direction."

According to Karenga, the name Kwanzaa derives from the Swahili phrase matunda ya kwanza, meaning "first fruits". First fruits festivals exist in Southern Africa and are celebrated in December/January with the southern solstice. Karenga was partly inspired by an account he read of the Zulu festival Umkhosi Wokweshwama. It was decided to spell the holiday's name with an additional "a" so that it would have a symbolic seven letters.

During the early years of Kwanzaa, Karenga said it was meant to be an alternative to Christmas. He believed Jesus was psychotic and Christianity was a "White" religion that Black people should shun. As Kwanzaa gained mainstream adherents, Karenga altered his position so practicing Christians would not be alienated, stating in the 1997 book Kwanzaa: A Celebration of Family, Community, and Culture that "Kwanzaa was not created to give people an alternative to their own religion or religious holiday." Many African Americans who celebrate Kwanzaa do so in addition to observing Christmas.

After its creation in California, Kwanzaa spread outside the United States to other parts of the African diaspora, but does not appear to be directly observed in any African countries.

== Nguzo Saba (The Seven Principles) ==
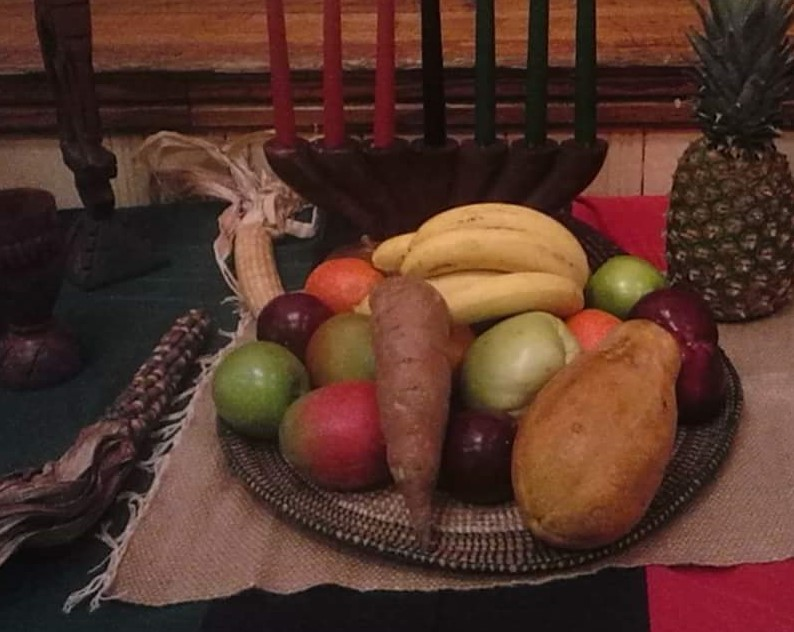
A display of Kwanzaa symbols with fruit and vegetables

Kwanzaa celebrates what its founder called the seven principles of Kwanzaa, or Nguzo Saba (originally Nguzu Saba – the seven principles of African Heritage). They were developed in 1965, a year before Kwanzaa itself. These seven principles are all Swahili words, and together comprise the Kawaida or "common" philosophy, a synthesis of nationalist, pan-Africanist, and socialist values.

Each of the seven days of Kwanzaa is dedicated to one of the principles, as follows:

1. Umoja (Unity): To strive for and to maintain unity in the family, community, nation, and race.
2. Kujichagulia (Self-determination): To define and name ourselves, as well as to create and speak for ourselves.
3. Ujima (Collective work and responsibility): To build and maintain our community together and make our brothers' and sisters' problems our problems and to solve them together.
4. Ujamaa (Cooperative economics): To build and maintain our own stores, shops, and other businesses and to profit from them together.
5. Nia (Purpose): To make our collective vocation the building and developing of our community in order to restore our people to their traditional greatness.
6. Kuumba (Creativity): To do always as much as we can, in the way we can, in order to leave our community more beautiful and beneficial than we inherited it.
7. Imani (Faith): To believe with all our hearts in our people, our parents, our teachers, our leaders, and the righteousness and victory of our struggle.

== Symbols ==
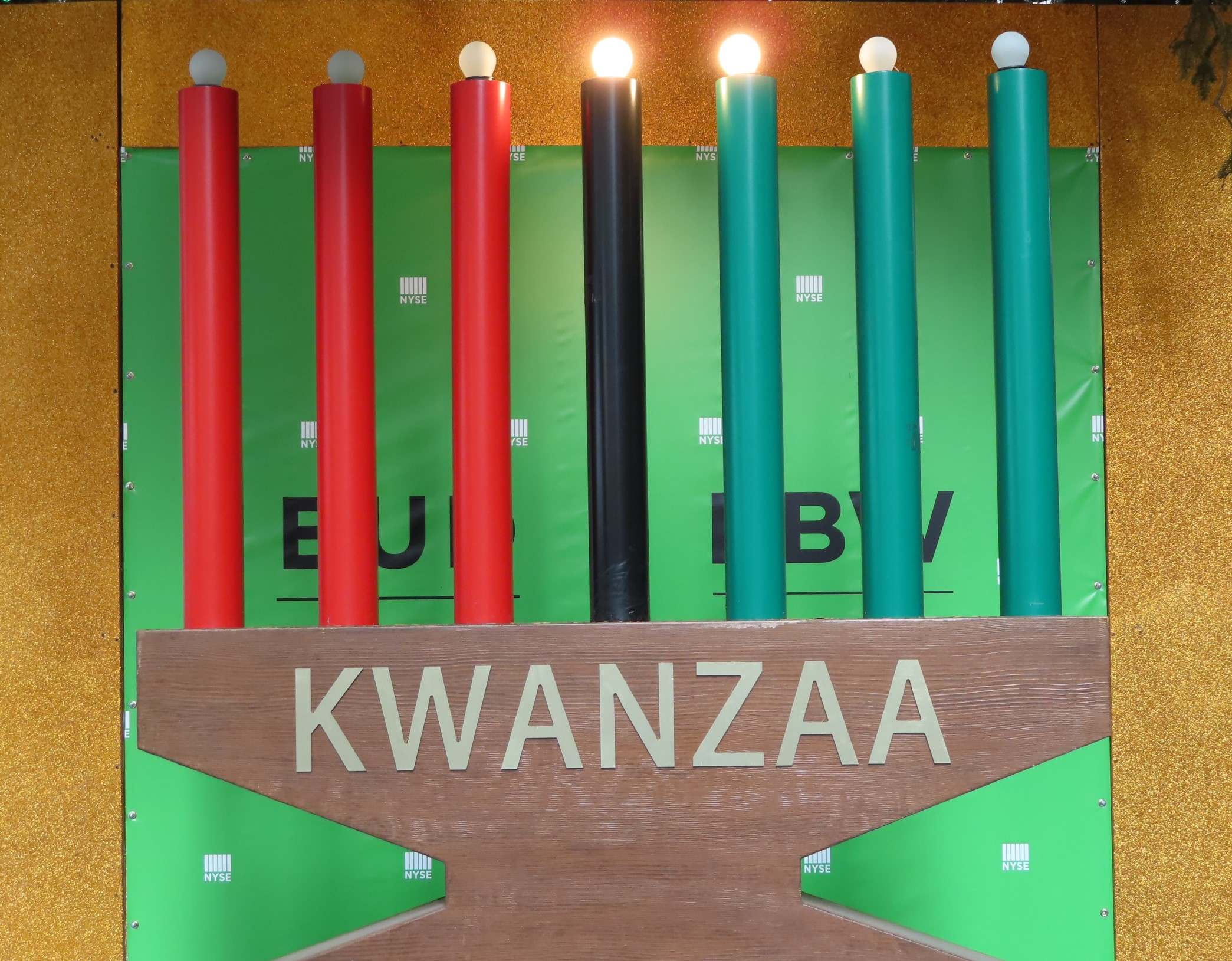
2019 public kinara in New York City

Kwanzaa celebratory symbols include a mat (Mkeka) on which other symbols are placed:

- a Kinara (candle holder for seven candlesticks)
- Mishumaa Saba (seven candles)
- mazao (crops)
- Mahindi (corn), to represent the children celebrating (and corn may be part of the holiday meal).
- a Kikombe cha Umoja (unity cup) for commemorating and giving shukrani (thanks) to African Ancestors
- Zawadi (gifts).

Supplemental representations include a Nguzo Saba poster, the black, red, and green bendera (flag), and African books and artworks—all to represent values and concepts reflective of African culture and contribution to community building and reinforcement.

== Observances ==
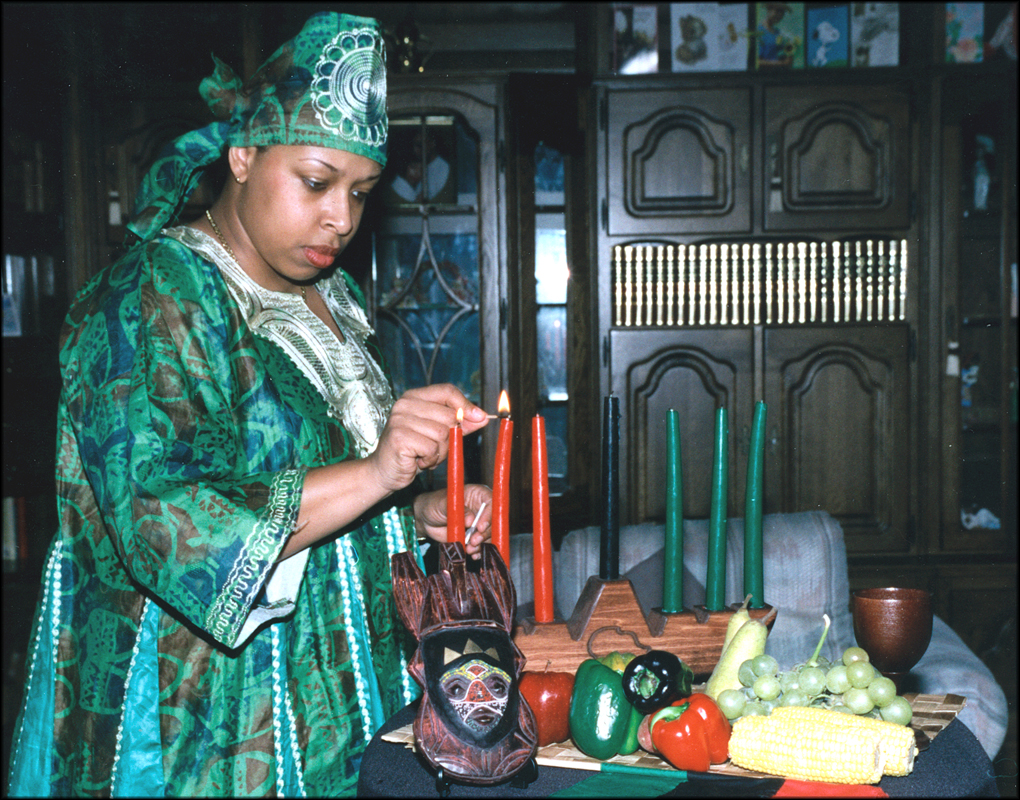
A woman lighting candles for Kwanzaa. The black candle in the middle represents unity, the three green candles on the right represent earth, and the three red candles on the left represent the struggle of African Americans or the shedding of blood.

Families celebrating Kwanzaa decorate their households with objects of art, colorful African cloth such as kente, especially the wearing of kaftans by women, and fresh fruits representing African idealism. It is customary to include children in Kwanzaa ceremonies and to give respect and gratitude to ancestors. Libations are shared, generally with a common chalice (Kikombe cha Umoja) passed around to all celebrants. Non-African Americans also celebrate Kwanzaa, including celebrities like Angelina Jolie. "Joyous Kwanzaa" may be used as a greeting during the holiday.

A Kwanzaa ceremony may include drumming and musical selections, libations, a reading of the "African Pledge and the Principles of Blackness," contemplation on the Pan-African colors, discussion of the African principle of the day or a chapter of African history, a candle-lighting ritual, artistic performances, and, finally, a feast of faith known as Karamu Ya Imani. The greeting for each day of Kwanzaa is Habari Gani?, which is Swahili for "How are you?"

At first, observers of Kwanzaa avoided the mixing of the holiday or its symbols, values, and practice with other holidays, as doing so would violate the principle of kujichagulia (self-determination) and thus violate the integrity of the holiday, which is partially intended as a reclamation of important African values. Today, some African American families celebrate Kwanzaa along with Christmas and the New Year.

Cultural exhibitions include the Spirit of Kwanzaa, an annual celebration held at the John F. Kennedy Center for the Performing Arts featuring interpretive dance, African dance, song, and poetry.

=== Karamu ===
A Karamu Ya Imani (Feast of Faith) is a feast typically on December 31, the sixth day of the Kwanzaa period. The Karamu feast was developed in Chicago during a 1971 citywide movement of Pan-African organizations. Hannibal Afrik of Shule ya Watoto proposed it as a community-wide promotional and educational campaign. The initial Karamu Ya Imani occurred on January 1, 1973, at a 200-person gathering at the Ridgeland club.

In 1992, the National Black United Front (NBUF) of Chicago held one of the country's largest Karamu Ya Imani celebrations. It included dancing, a youth ensemble and a keynote speech by NBUF and prominent Black nationalist leader Conrad Worrill.

The celebration includes the following practices:

- Kukaribisha (Welcoming)
- Kuumba (Remembering)
- Kuchunguza Tena Na Kutoa Ahadi Tena (Reassessment and Recommitment)
- Kushangilia (Rejoicing)
- Tamshi la Tambiko (Libation Statement)
- Tamshi la Tutaonana (The Farewell Statement)

== Adherence ==
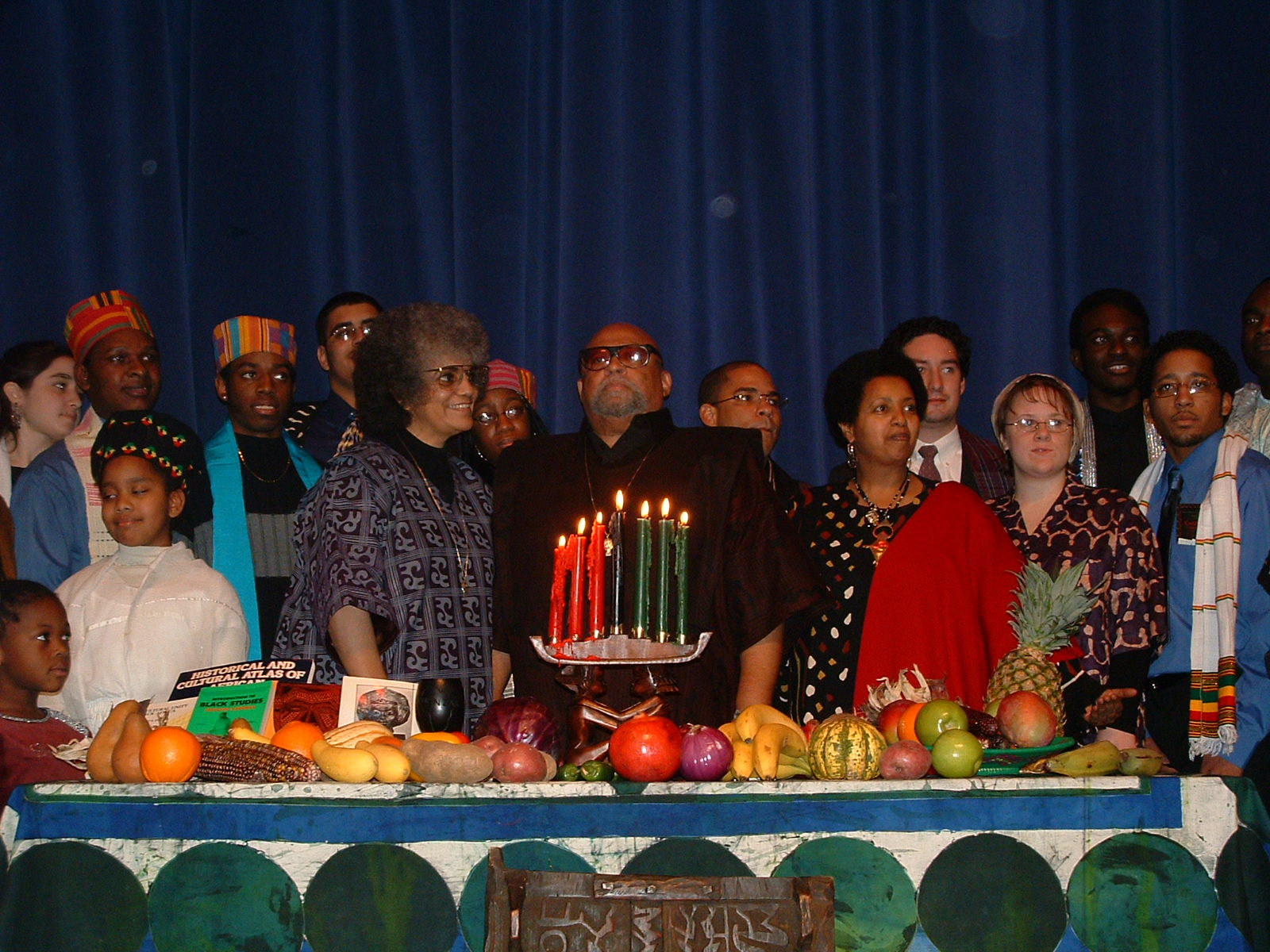
A 2003 Kwanzaa celebration with Kwanzaa founder Maulana Karenga at the center, and others

The popularity of the celebration of Kwanzaa has declined since the 1990s. Kwanzaa observation has declined in both community and commercial contexts. University of Minnesota scholar Keith Mayes did not report exact figures, noting that it is also difficult to determine these for the three other main African-American holidays, which he names as Martin Luther King Jr. Day, Malcolm X Day, and Juneteenth. Mayes added that white institutions now also celebrate it. Certain communities of the Nation of Islam, an African American new religious movement, celebrate Kwanzaa.

In a 2019 National Retail Federation poll, 2.6 percent of people who planned to celebrate a winter holiday said they would celebrate Kwanzaa. Roughly 14% of the United States population is African American.

Starting in the 1990s, the holiday became increasingly commercialized, with the first Hallmark Cards being sold in 1992. Some have expressed concern about this potentially damaging the holiday's values.

== Recognition ==
The first Kwanzaa stamp, designed by Synthia Saint James, was issued by the United States Post Office in 1997, and in the same year Bill Clinton gave the first presidential declaration marking the holiday. Subsequent presidents George W. Bush, Barack Obama, Donald Trump, and Joe Biden also issued greetings to celebrate Kwanzaa.

Maya Angelou narrated a 2008 documentary film about Kwanzaa, The Black Candle, written and directed by M. K. Asante and featuring Chuck D.

== Practice outside the United States ==
Other countries where Kwanzaa is celebrated include Barbados, Brazil, Canada, Great Britain, and Jamaica. There have been calls in Barbados for Kwanzaa to be recognized as a national holiday.

In Canada it is celebrated in provinces including Saskatchewan and Ontario. Kwanzaa week was first declared in Toronto in 2018. There are local chapters that emerged in the 2010s in provinces like British Columbia, where there are much smaller groups of the diaspora, founding members may be immigrants from countries like Uganda.

== See also ==
- Festivus
- Public holidays in the United States
