= Human rights in the Gambia =

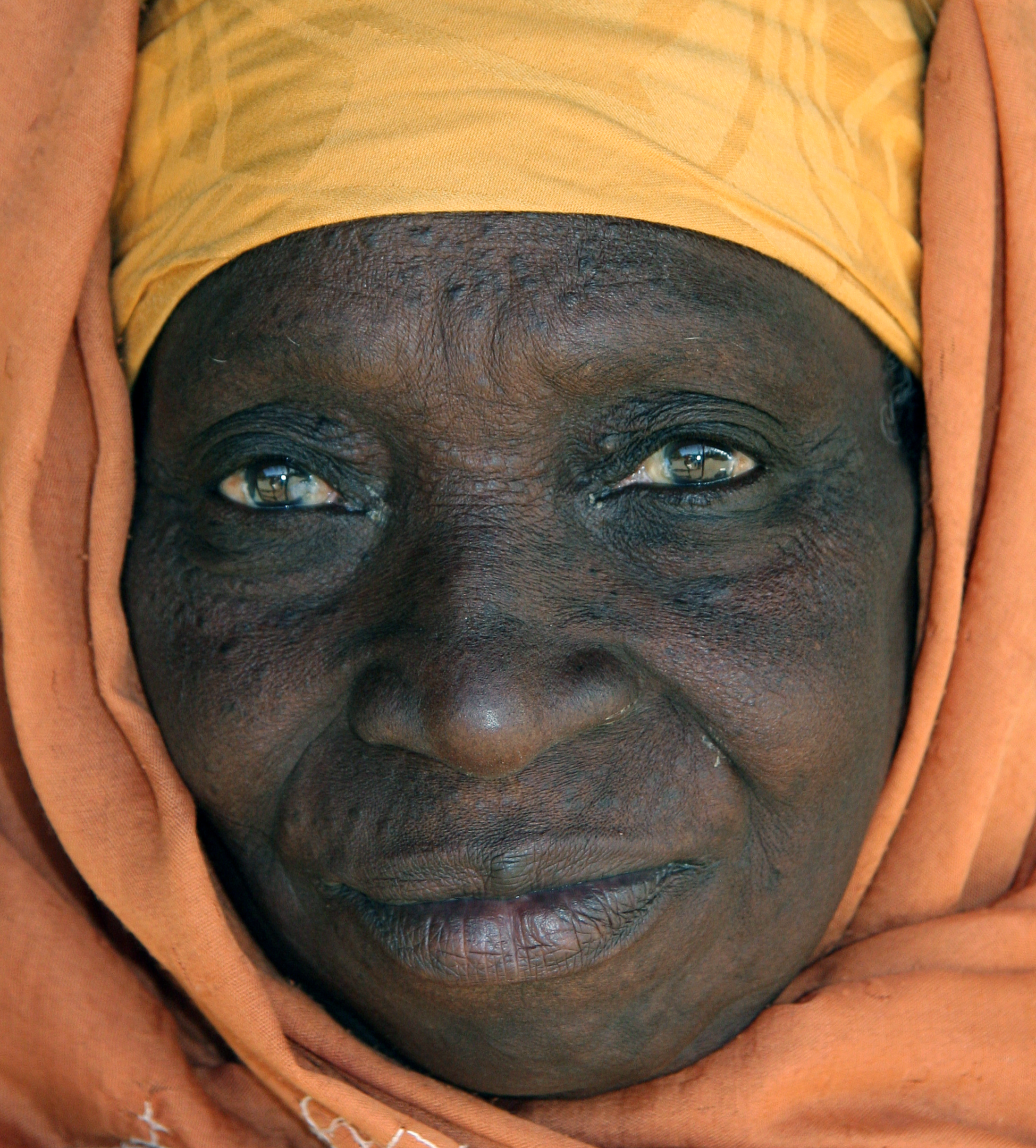
Gambian woman, 2008

Human rights in the Gambia have been considered poor under Yahya Jammeh. In December 2016, he lost an election to Adama Barrow, who promised to improve human rights in his country. The "Freedom in the World" report for 2018 ranked the Gambia as "partly free". LGBTQ activity is illegal, and punishable with life imprisonment.

== See also ==
- Female genital mutilation in the Gambia
- Human trafficking in the Gambia
- LGBTQ rights in the Gambia
