= Adama Samassékou =

Malian politician (1946–2024)

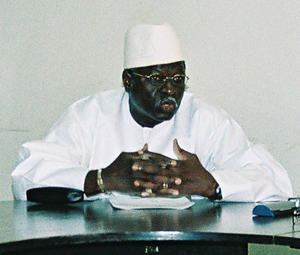

Minister of Education
- In office 1993–2000
- Prime Minister: Ibrahim Boubacar Keïta

Personal details
- Born: 1946
- Died: 23 February 2024 (aged 77–78)
- Occupation: Politician

Adama Samassékou (1946 – 23 February 2024) was a Malian politician. He was Minister of Education from 1993 to 2000. Samassékou also served as president of the first preparatory phase of the World Summit on the Information Society.

== Life and career ==
Samassékou was born in 1946. He studied philology and linguistics at universities in Moscow and Paris. He was Malian Minister of Education from 1993 to 2000. He served under Prime Minister Ibrahim Boubacar Keïta. Samassékou was spokesperson for the Government of Mali from 1997 until 2000. Samassékou served between July 2002 and December 2003 as the president of the PrepCom of the Geneva phase of the World Summit on the Information Society (WSIS). In role as chairperson of WSIS he introduced a non-paper in November 2003 to propose a new negotiating text.

At one point, at least in 2002 and 2006, he served as president of the African Academy of Languages. In a meeting before the African ministers of education he stressed the importance of using local languages in schools, underpinning this with evidence from school results from children in Mali. From 2003, he was a member of the Haut Conseil de la Francophonie.

Playing an active role in community life, Samassékou was the founding president, for Mali and Africa as a whole, of the Peoples' Movement for Human Rights Education, in association with PDHRE, and beginning on 21 October 2005, president of the International Federation of ICVolunteers. In the political sphere, he was the founding chairman of ADEMA-France.

Samassékou was head of the linguistic department of the Institute of Human Sciences of Mali, then director of the National Library of Mali and adviser to the minister in charge of culture. He was later the president of the MAAYA World Network for Linguistic Diversity.

In 2008 Samassékou became president of the International Council for Philosophy and Human Sciences. He was affiliated with the organisation for a total of twelve years until 2020. In 2010, Samassékou served as one of the commissioners of the Broadband Commission for Digital Development.

Samassékou made an appearance in the 2010 documentary film Motherland.

Samassékou spoke Bamanankan (English: Bambara), Songhay, Fulfulde (English: Fula; French: Peul), French, Russian and English. He died on 23 February 2024, at the age of 78.
