= African classical music =

Music genre

African classical music is a music genre that combines the techniques of European classical music with the musical traditions of Africa. The genre was founded by Ephraim Amu and Fela Sowande in West Africa, and later spread to North Africa through Sayed Darwish. Composers continue to practice African classical music in the 21st century, particularly in the Democratic Republic of the Congo, while others are working to revive forgotten works from the canon.

== Origins ==
African classical music originated in the Christian church choirs of Nigeria and Ghana in the early 20th century. During the early years of British colonisation in both countries, only sacred music from Europe was sung in churches. When the British administration finally permitted African songs to be performed in churches, Ghanaian Ephraim Amu and Nigerian Fela Sowande — both introduced to music through their Christian upbringings — were the first to seek to introduce traditional rhythms, thereby laying the foundations of African art music. They made use of Yoruba and Igbo percussion, yet their compositions retained a classical form, as they were intended to reach Western audiences as well. Amu's pioneering contribution lay in his adoption of two or sometimes three beats for all his African works, as well as his emphasis on vocal rhythm, "the consequent length of words and syllables as determining elements of the relative values of the notes to which they are assigned; and the construction of choral melodies as reflections of the vocal contours of songs." His work contributed to the emergence of Ghanaian classical music and choral song, and his vision continues to influence composers in terms of style and direction, particularly in the integration of African and European musical elements.

Sowande and Amu are therefore regarded as the founding fathers of African classical music.

=== African pianism ===
After a period in London, where he became choirmaster and organist at the Methodist church, Fela Sowande recorded his Suite Africaine for strings in 1951. Meanwhile, a new and highly prolific generation of composers from Ghana and Nigeria took up the genre, moving beyond the purely religious framework to develop a new musical language. Among them was Ghanaian Kwabena Nketia, "known for revolutionising the notation system used to transcribe traditional music, its rhythms and melodies into Western scores." His musical career was defined by a desire to compose and to undertake deep study of traditional African music.

In the 1960s, Nigerian Akin Euba developed the technique of African pianism, aiming to make "the piano behave like an African instrument." He considered the piano the most effective means of bridging the worlds of art music and traditional music, as in his view "it already has certain affinities with African music" and its instruments, such as drums, xylophones, or thumb pianos. Gyimah Larbi also followed this principle in his compositions in 1994.

== In North Africa ==
In North Africa, the characteristic scales of Berber, Arabo-Andalusian, Coptic, and Sahrawi traditions gradually permeated the European classical repertoire, which had been present in Egypt since Napoleon's first military campaign in 1798. African classical music thus emerged from the region's rich rhythmic heritage, at the turn of the 20th century, when Arabic music played in singing cafés encountered the European classical music of the Cairo Opera House, the first opera house in Africa.

Sayed Darwish, known as the father of Egyptian popular music, was the first composer in the region to blend Egyptian folklore with European instruments such as the French horn. His works tell the story of a people striving for independence from the British Empire, social justice, and cultural modernity.

A generation later, Sudan underwent a similar musical fusion. Composer Hamza El Din, born in 1924, became known for bringing Nubian melodies to light. In Waterwheel, he adapted the percussion of that region for European string instruments, as a protest against the construction of the Aswan High Dam, which in the 1960s submerged Nubian villages along the Nile.

Composers born after independence have used African classical music to showcase the region's diversity to the world and to assert their own identities, inspiring several successive generations of composers across North Africa. This repertoire includes the symphonies of Algerian composer Salim Dada, the works of Moroccan pianist Marouan Benabdallah, and those of internationally acclaimed Moroccan composer Nabil Benabdeljalil, whose piece Badawiyya draws on the scales and sonorities of rural Arabic-speaking music in the violin parts, underpinned by percussive, sometimes dissonant piano chords.

== In the 21st century ==
In the 21st century, African classical music is practised and taught in several African countries. Hundreds of composers work in this genre, among them Nigerian Tunde Jegede, who combines the kora with the cello.

=== In the DRC ===
In the Democratic Republic of the Congo, composers have embraced the genre by bringing classical music together with Congolese rumba. In the 1950s, Congolese rumba was the genre that accompanied the country on its path to independence, while classical music was learned and listened to only by Belgian colonists. Congolese musicologist Manda Tchebwa has stated that "any mixing with rumba was then considered an attack on the sovereignty of this national music, which is the absolute reference of the people."

In 1994, the Kimbanguist Symphony Orchestra (KSO) was founded within the Kimbanguist Church and brought classical music to audiences across the country and around the world. In recent years, a wave of composers has sought to give birth to an African classical music tradition in the DRC, drawing on the rhythms of different ethnic groups. The KSO's founder, Simon Kimbangu, draws on Pygmy music in his symphony Mon Identité, which uses a Western structure and Western instruments within a distinctly Pygmy sonic palette, characterised here by polyphony and echo repetition. Héritier Mayimbi, the KSO's principal double bassist and considered a pioneer in the creation of a Congolese classical music, draws on the rhythms of the Luba people, combining drums with string instruments.

The Institut National des Arts (INA) in Kinshasa trains students in this new repertoire, but the school still lacks experimental platforms, such as a symphony orchestra.

=== Revisiting the founders' works ===
In the United Kingdom, Ochenna Ngwe has been working to revisit the history of classical music by the founders, such as Fela Sowande, some of whose works have not necessarily been preserved. She has noted that "people like Fela Sowande, for example, were very popular in Britain in the 1930s, 1940s and 1950s, and his music was published. It is still available in some form, including his organ works. But his larger works seem to have fallen out of favour for various reasons. Publishers tend not to keep documents forever." In this work of reconstruction, through the Plainsight SOUND project, she is joined by the first African classical double bassist, Leon Bosch, and Nigerian-Romanian pianist Rebeca Omordia.

Rebeca Omordia, challenged by cellist Julian Lloyd Webber when she was unable to name well-known African classical musicians, spent seven years discovering more than 200 composers and launched a series of "African Concerts" in London in 2019, featuring numerous previously unrecorded works for piano, double bass, string quartet, and song. She subsequently recorded an album, Ekele, devoted to Nigerian composers Ayo Bankole, Fred Onovwerosuoke, and Christian Onyeji.

== Notable albums ==
- Lambarena (1994), a collaboration between French musician Hughes de Courson and Gabonese musician Pierre Akendengué, combining Bach cantatas and the final chorus of his St John Passion with songs and rhythms from the Gabonese forest.
- Pieces of Africa (1992), works commissioned from seven African composers by American ensemble Kronos Quartet.
- Douala-Brazza (2005) by Rido Bayonne, blending Afro-jazz, Congolese rumba, Cameroonian makossa, and classical music.
- Requiem pour L (2016) by director Alain Platel and composer Fabrizio Cassol: a blend of classical music, operatic singing, and African music that reimagines Mozart's Requiem. Performers include Owen Metsileng, Nobulumko Mngxekeza, and Fredy Massamba.
- Passion Congo (2026) by Ray Lema, fusing Congolese music with European classical music.

== See also ==
- South African jazz
