= Sona Jobarteh =

Gambian musician (born 1983)

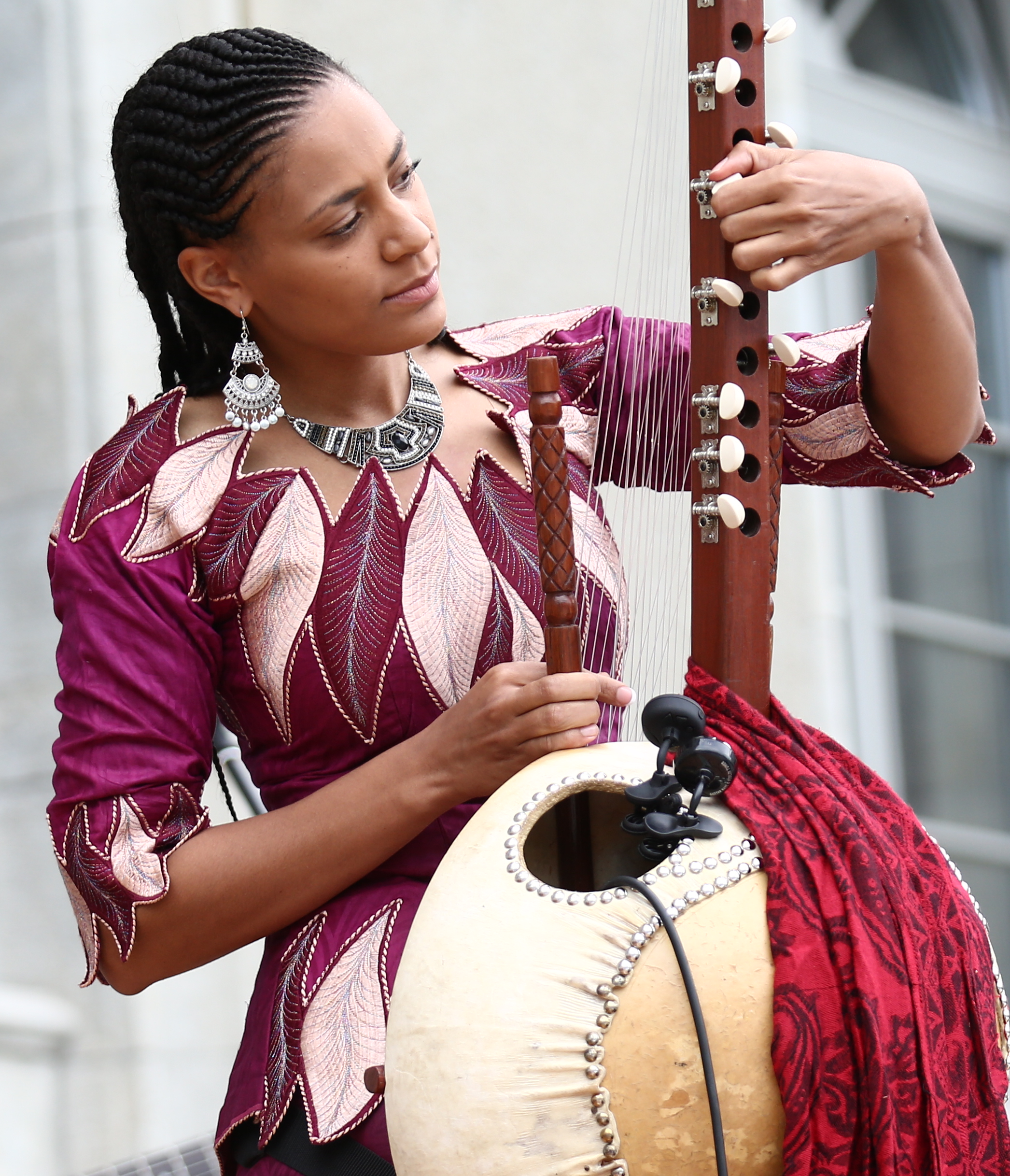
- Jobarteh at the Aid for Trade Global Review, 2017

Background information
- Born: Maya Sona Jobarteh; 17 October 1983 (age 43); London, England
- Origin: The Gambia
- Genres: Music of West Africa; film score
- Occupation: musician
- Instruments: Kora, voice, guitar, cello
- Years active: 1987–present
- Label: African Guild
- Website: sonajobarteh.com

Sona Jobarteh (born 1983) is a Gambian multi-instrumentalist, singer, and composer. She is from one of the five principal kora-playing griot families of West Africa, and is the first female professional kora player to come from a griot family. She is the granddaughter of kora virtuoso Amadu Bansang Jobarteh, cousin of the celebrated kora player Toumani Diabaté, and is the sister of the diaspora kora player Tunde Jegede.

== Early life and education ==
Born in London, England, Maya Sona Jobarteh is a member of one of the five principal kora-playing (griot) families from West Africa, and the first female member of such a family to rise to prominence on this instrument. The playing of this 21-stringed harp-like instrument was exclusively passed down from father to son. The instrument is an important element of the Mandingo peoples in West Africa and their playing is reserved only to certain families called griot.

She is the granddaughter of the griot of her line, Amadu Bansang Jobarteh, whose father migrated from Mali to Gambia. Her cousin is the well-known, celebrated kora player Toumani Diabaté. Her mother Galina Chester is English. She has a son, Sidiki Jobarteh-Codjoe, born in 2010.

Jobarteh has studied the kora since the age of three, at first taught by her brother Tunde Jegede, who is 11 years older, and with whom she traveled several times a year to the Gambia as a child, and then by her father, Sanjally Jobarteh. She attended the Royal College of Music, where she studied cello, piano and harpsichord, and soon after went on to the Purcell School of Music to study composition. She also completed a degree at SOAS University of London. She is fluent in Mandinka as well as in English. She proudly embraces her Mundang heritage.

== Musical career ==
She gave her first performance at London's Jazz Café at the age of four, and performed at festivals several times in her early childhood.

When still a music student, she worked on several orchestral projects, including the "River of Sound" with the Irish Chamber Orchestra, featuring Evelyn Glennie, and other collaborative works, including performances with the Royal Philharmonic Orchestra, Britten Sinfonia, Milton Keynes City Orchestra and the Viva Chamber Orchestra.

In 2002, Jobarteh performed in Vienna with the renowned jazz vocalist Cleveland Watkiss, also forming a part of his support act for Cassandra Wilson at the Barbican in London. She also featured on Damon Albarn's Mali Music Project, which was later performed for Jools Holland.

Jobarteh has collaborated on stage with Oumou Sangaré, Toumani Diabaté, Kasse Made Diabaté and the BBC Symphony Orchestra. Jobarteh is a regular member of her brother Tunde Jegede's African Classical Music Ensemble, which has toured England, Ireland, Africa and parts of the Caribbean. She has contributed to his albums Malian Royal Court Music and Lamentations, for which she composed two pieces, one of which also featured on the album Trance Planet Vol. 5 (released on Triloka records, Virgin in the US). She also works with the distinguished spoken-word artist HKB FiNN as an instrumentalist, co-writer, singer and producer. For her solo work, such as her performance at the 2014 Festival Internacional Cervantino, in Mexico, she has a band with members Kari Bannermann on electric guitar, Kyazi Lugangira on acoustic guitar, Mamadou Sarr on African percussions (as calabash or djembe), Alexander Boateng on drums and Andi McLean on the bass.

Her debut album was Afro-Acoustic Soul, containing songs about bittersweet love and social themes. The influences on this album are mixed with some that could be played on more conventional European radio formats. Her second was Fasiya (2011). She makes a guest appearance on the 2021 album Djourou by Ballake Sissoko.

Jobarteh also teaches the kora in London. She worked with her father, Sanjally Jobarteh, in setting up a formal music school in the Gambia, named after her famous grandfather.

== Film composer ==
Sona Jobarteh made her debut as a film composer in 2009 when she was commissioned to create the soundtrack to a documentary film on Africa entitled Motherland.

The score was an innovative exploration into the cinematic representation of a classical African sound world. While much of Jobarteh's score drew primarily on the West African griot tradition, she also had to reinvent it to accommodate for the demands of the visual realm.

To create this film score, Jobarteh explored instruments in different ways to that of their traditional setting. She has used the kora as a bass instrument as well as tuning it to an "Arabic" scale. She has used the guitar to emulate the sound of an African lute, as well as being influenced by the West African griot style of playing.

She invented a new instrument called the Nkoni for use in many of the compositions to capture a unique sound. This instrument is a cross between the kora and the Donso Ngoni, expanding the tonality and mood of the African musical sonic. Jobarteh's vocal style draws on the West African griot style, although there are aspects that also lean towards East African influences.

Factored into the creation of a unique African aesthetic was Jobarteh's avoidance of two crucial paradigms; first, the reliance on the cinematic familiarity of western stringed instruments, and secondly the stereotypical predominance of drumming as a signature of African musical representation.

== Artistry ==
She is English-born of African heritage, and strongly identifies with the latter. Spending significant time in both the UK and the Gambia, she blends different musical styles, from both the European and West African traditions. However, unlike her contemporaries, she explores and expands on traditional African roots rather than trying to fuse them with contemporary hip-hop and jazz. Instead, she looks to reinterpret traditional music. In addition to the kora, she also sings and plays the guitar.

== Discography ==
- Producer and guest artist on Spoken Herbs (2006)
- Music of the Diaspora (500 Years Later soundtrack) (Souljazzfunk, 2006)
- Guest artist on Nu Beginin' (Ty2, 2007)
- Afro Acoustic Soul (Sona Soul Records, 2008)
- Producer and guest artist on Light in the Shade of Darkness (HKB FiNN, 2008)
- Motherland: The Score (African Guild Records, 2010)
- Fasiya (African Guild Records, 2011)
- Badinyaa Kumoo (African Guild Records, 2022)

== Film credits ==
- 500 Years Later (kora player)
- The Idea (actress)
- Broken Embraces (kora player)
- The First Grader (singer)
- Motherland (composer)
- Beast (performer, producer and writer: "N'na Duniyaa")
