= Amadu Bansang Jobarteh =

Gambian musician (1915–2001)

- Portrait in 1987

Background information
- Born: 1915; Tambasansang, British Gambia
- Died: April 8, 2001 (aged 86) Bansang, The Gambia
- Genres: Folk music of Mali; akonting; world music
- Occupation: Musician
- Instrument: Kora
- Children: Sanjally Jobarteh (son)
- Relatives: Sona Jobarteh (granddaughter); Sidiki Diabaté (nephew); Toumani Diabaté (grand nephew)

Amadu "Bansang" Jobarteh (sometimes spelled Jabate or Diabaté; 1915 – April 8, 2001) was a Gambian musician and virtuoso player of the kora. He performed and popularized the traditional music of Mali and was one of the most respected masters of kora before his death.

== Early life and education ==
Jobarteh was born in 1915 in Tambasansang, a small Wuli District village on the Upper River Region of the Gambia River, in what was then the British Gambia. His father was originally from Mali (administered as French Sudan) but settled in Tambasansang, where Jobarteh's grandfather Amadou was born. Jobarteh was named after his grandfather. After his father's death, the family moved to Bansang, and Jobarteh was raised there. He later moved to Essau, where he was given the nickname "Bansang" to distinguish him from others, and later to Bakau on the coast.

His family originated in Brikama and belonged to the griot (Manding: jali) caste of oral and musical storytellers. Jobarteh came from a long family tradition of players of the kora, a 21-string west African harp-like instrument. He was introduced to music by his father Fili Jobarteh, a jali who played kora, although he was taught to play kora by his elder brother Bala Jobarteh, who was the father of Sidiki Diabaté and grandfather of the renowned Toumani Diabaté.

== Musical career ==
Jobarteh was considered to be a master of the kora. Critics wrote that the clarity of his tone and distinct style of improvisation were immediately recognizable. He expanded the standard repertoire of kora, especially through his transcriptions of music for the akonting African lute, and he had the dexterity to employ polyphony and voicing, making him unique among solo performers.

He adapted a number of songs written in praise of important figures to the kora. One such piece was Tutu Jara, one of the oldest pieces in the repertoire and originally performed by a singer accompanied by multiple akonting. Jobarteh transcribed it for the kora and recorded the piece in 1978 as a virtuosic solo instrumental, incorporating traditional material alongside his own variations. The story tells of a Malian princess with stillborn children who prays for a snake (tutu) to ensure the survival of her baby boy, whom she names Tutu Jara.

He tuned his kora from a central tonic string he treated as the keynote, then set the "answerer" string and the others in relation to it, adjusting individual notes by ear—among them the raised fourth that gave his Sauta tuning its distinctive sound. By the 1990s, as the oldest living jali from Eastern Gambia, his account of oral history behind standard kora pieces like "Allah l'a ke" came to be considered authoritative by ethnomusicologists.

Toward the end of his career, Jobarteh traveled extensively through Britain, the United States, Canada, and Europe through the World of Music, Arts and Dance (WOMAD) festival. He was a member of The Gambia National Troupe and attended the second Conference on Manding Studies hosted by the Royal Anthropological Institute in London in 1972. He frequently accompanied Bamba Suso, and also recorded music with his student Tunde Jegede. Jobarteh held a post at the University of Michigan and taught music at the University of Washington (UW) for a year as visiting lecturer. The UW Ethnomusicology Archive contains a number of his recordings. In 1978, he traveled to England, and recordings were made at the University of Cambridge for the Cambridge Audio-Visual Ethnomusicological Archive.

Jobarteh died in Bansang in April 2001, aged 86. He was buried in his family village of Kembujae.

== Legacy ==
Sidia Jatta, a Gambian member of Parliament and founder of the People's Democratic Organisation for Independence and Socialism (PDOIS) Party, referred to him as a living "library" of African history. According to his son Alagie Pampo Jobarteh, Jatta "would sit beside [him] on a mat...discussing oral history" in their family home in the village of Kembujae. The Fatu Network wrote in 2018 that Jobarteh had a good relationship with Dawda Jawara, the first President of the Gambia, and that he was the personal griot of the former Chief Sanjally Bojang, one of the founders of the country's first ruling People's Progressive Party (PPP) Party. The Los Angeles Philharmonic described him as an "icon in Gambia’s cultural and musical history".

As part of his cultural custom, Jobarteh married four women: Kumuna Sakiliba, Kachikaly Suso, Lanla Conteh, and Nyima Cham. He fathered over 17 children. He is the grandfather of Sona Jobarteh. The Amadou Bansang Jobarteh School of Music was founded in 1996 by his son Sanjally Jobarteh to teach kora, later becoming a music school.

== Discography ==
- Kora Manding: Mandinka Music of the Gambia (Ethnodisc Recordings, 1972)
- Master of the Kora (Eavadisc, 1978)
- Tabara (Music of the World, 1993)
- Gambia for the People (The Orchard, 2001)
