= George Daniels Ekarte =

British-Nigerian Christian leader and community activist

- Born: Calabar, Nigeria
- Died: 12 July 1964; Liverpool, England
- Title: Pastor

George Daniels Ekarte (born 1890s, died 12 July 1964) was a Christian philanthropist and community activist. He founded the African Churches Mission in Liverpool in July 1931.

== Biography ==
George Daniels Ekarte's place of birth was Calabar, Nigeria. His date of birth is recorded as 1 January 1904, though based on his own testimony, it is thought he was born earlier in the 1890s. As a child Ekarte worked as an errand boy for Dr. Wilkie, a missionary in Calabar. He left Dr. Willkie's service to join another missionary Mary Slessor in Itu where he learned to read and write.

Slessor died in January 1915 and Ekarte travelled to Liverpool, England, possibly the same year. This would have made him just 11 if his date of birth (1 January 1904) on the Identity Service Certificate he was issued with in 1926 was correct. His name on the certificate was recorded as George Daniel though he became popularly known as Daniels Ekarte following his move to Liverpool.

Ekarte was shocked by his early experiences of racism in Liverpool. He became disillusioned with the Christian faith until stumbling upon a gathering of Africans engaged in worship at 4 Hardy Street one Sunday morning. This triggered Ekarte to begin holding his own services, anywhere he could, including in open spaces.

== African Churches Mission ==
Ekarte set up the African Churches Mission in 1931 at 122-124 Hill Street, Toxteth, a suburb in Liverpool. In 1934 the Mission had 466 registered members, rising to 558 by 1936. 148 children were on the Sunday school roll in 1934. Mission Sunday service attracted congregations of up to 80, mainly by African men, many of them sailors, and their English wives.

Free meals given to local people was a popular community service provided by the Mission. In 1933 13,336 free meals were provided. From 1944 to 1949 the Mission became home to children born of relationships between English women and African-American GIs stationed in Liverpool. The Mission also provided services for local people including services a canteen. A plaque was unveiled at 151 Hill Street, Toxteth, the site of the African Churches Mission, on 13 August 2023.

The African Churches Mission was demolished and Ekarte moved to a flat at 27 Avison Terrace. He died on 12 July 1964 a few weeks after being moved from the Mission. He was buried in an unmarked grave in Allerton Cemetery on 20 July 1964. A memorial and headstone was laid on his grave in August 2023. In 2005 social housing was built on the land where the African Churches Mission had been situated.
