= Keith Mayes =

American historian

Keith A. Mayes is an associate professor at the College of Liberal Arts, University of Minnesota Twin Cities in the department of African American & African Studies, where he is director of undergraduate studies.

== Family and education ==
Mayes earned a PhD in history from Princeton University in 2002.

== Early career ==
At the University of Minnesota, Mayes worked on curricula and developing new classes. He specialized in African American history since 1960, and in social and political movements.

Mayes was a guest on C-SPAN in 2018, after the killing of Philando Castile. He spoke on Meet the Press in 2021, after the conviction in the murder of George Floyd, and again in 2021, discussing debate on teaching race in American schools.

== Awards ==
- Horace T. Morse-University of Minnesota Alumni Association Award for Outstanding Contributions to Undergraduate Education, 2018

== Publications ==
Journals

- Mayes, Keith A. (Winter 2006). "Countervailing Forces in African-American Civic Activism 1973-1994 by Frederick[sic] C. Harris". Political Science Quarterly. 121 (4). Academy of Political Science: 720–721. doi:10.1002/j.1538-165X.2006.tb01564.x.
- Mayes, Keith A. (2010). "Review of Richard Iton, In Search of the Black Fantastic: Politics and Popular Culture in the Post-Civil Rights Era". Political Science Quarterly. 125 (1). Academy of Political Science: 158–60. doi:10.1002/j.1538-165X.2010.tb01990.x.

Books

- Mayes, Keith A. (2009). Civil Rights and Black Power: The Struggle for Black Equality in the United States, 1945-1975. Routledge. ISBN 978-0-415-99129-2.
- Mayes, Keith A. (2009). Kwanzaa: Black Power and the Making of the African-American Black Holiday Tradition. Taylor & Francis. ISBN 978-0-415-99854-3.
- Mayes, Keith A. (2023). The Unteachables: Disability Rights and the Invention of Black Special Education. University of Minnesota Press. ISBN 978-1-4529-6474-4.
