= Ocacia =

Former smooth jazz band and performance group

- Origin: London, UK/Caribbean
- Genres: Smooth jazz
- Instruments: Piano, Drum and Bass
- Years active: 1999–present
- Labels: Souljazzfunk
- Members: Nadia Kanouche; Alik Shahadah; Brian McCooke; Sona Maya Jobarteh
- Past members: Natasha Odlum; David Hadley
- Website: http://www.ocacia.com

Ocacia was an international smooth jazz studio and performance group. In 2014 name was adopted by a UK clothing brand based in South Africa.

== Music ==
Ocacia is known for its socially conscious lyrics. The music is characterized by some as "escapist" in the usage of space, chords and ethnic overtones. The chord structure has an absences of "thirds" and is similar to other African Diaspora and African classical music by its “drum and bass” dominance. Not all the music fits into the smooth jazz canon, as some of it is more in the film score world. Their first album was released in 1999. The original members of the group were Owen 'Alik Shahadah (Piano/keyboards), Natasha Odlum-Shahadah (voice), David Hadley (Bass), Brian McCooke (drums). In 2002, Natasha Odlum left the group and Nadia Kanouche became the new lead feature vocalist. Ocacia works as a studio group composing soundtracks and is also known to work with other artists such as Sona Jobarteh and M. K. Asante Jr.

The name Ocacia is an African name derived from acacia.

== Selected track list ==
- If I...
- Tear for the World
- Crossing the Teneire
- Netsante
- Give me the day
- Come into the sunshine
- Absent Sun

== Discography ==
=== Albums ===
Title	Release	Remarks
Other Side of the Moon	1999	Souljazzfunk
Music of the Diaspora	2006	Souljazzfunk
