= 500 Years Later =

2005 US/UK documentary film by Owen 'Alik Shahadah

- Directed by: Owen 'Alik Shahadah
- Written by: M. K. Asante Jr.
- Produced by: Owen 'Alik Shahadah; Ako Oseyaba Mitchell
- Starring: Kimani Nehusi; Molefi Kete Asante; Maulana Karenga; Muhammad Shareef; Paul Robeson Jr. Welsing; Amiri Baraka; Bill Cosby; Hakim Adi; Khaleel Muhammad; Mighty Gabby; M. K. Asante Jr.
- Music by: Tunde Jegede; Ocacia
- Production companies: Halaqah Media Films; Asante Filmworx
- Distributed by: Codeblack Entertainment
- Release date: October 11, 2005
- Running time: 108 minutes
- Countries: United States; United Kingdom
- Language: English

500 Years Later (፭፻ ዓመታት በኋላ 500 ʿamätatə bähwala) is a 2005 independent documentary film directed by Owen 'Alik Shahadah and written by M. K. Asante Jr. It has won five international film festival awards in the category of Best Documentary, including the UNESCO "Breaking the Chains" award. It has won other awards including Best Documentary at the Pan African Film Festival in Los Angeles, Best Documentary at the Bridgetown Film Festival in Barbados, Best Film at the International Black Cinema Film Festival in Berlin, and Best International Documentary at the Harlem International Film Festival in New York.

500 Years Later has received praise and controversy, both for its creative documentary genre, and its social-political impact with relation to race study. The film premiered on February 28, 2005, at the Pan-African Awards (PAFF) and won Best Documentary there. It made its American television premiere on August 23, 2008, on TV One (Radio One), and Ethiopian Television premiere on October 27, 2007. It was shown nationally in South Africa on December 14, 2014, on SABC 2. In 2010, the sequel, Motherland, was released.

== Synopsis ==
500 Years Later studies the African diaspora and the impact of slavery throughout history, identifying key issues facing the world's black communities, including poor education, poverty, crime, and the way that such issues dehumanize and degrade black peoples. The film also gives insight into the struggles faced by continental Africans today, for instance in terms of poverty, disease, and corrupt governments. While the continuing negative impact, influence, and effects of the trans-Atlantic slave trade are highlighted, scholars interviewed for the film express hope that "old scars can be healed" and Africans as a race will advance through education about their history.

=== Narrative ===
The film states that the lasting effects of slavery are still felt 500 years later, hence the title. This is justified and explained through a series of scholarly interviews throughout the film. The film begins with an adage that illustrates its historical theme: "Until lions tell their story, the tale of the hunt will always glorify the hunter."

The promotional page for the producer of the film describes it thusly: "500 Years Later is a compelling journey, infused with the spirit and music of liberation, that chronicles the struggle of a people from enslavement who continue to fight for the most essential human right - freedom." The film presents the richness of African cultures and traditions and how they have evolved since slavery was abolished, emphasizing that prior to the beginning of the Atlantic Slave Trade Africans were free. The film includes testimonies, voices, and opinions gathered around five continents. Many of the people who voice their opinion are scholars or experts on the African diaspora. Those interviewed in the film criticize contemporary rap music as being particularly negative for Africans and their descendants, as they believe it reinforced racist stereotypes that were established in part because of the slave trade.

A lasting example of the stereotypes referenced in the film is a study performed by Kenneth and Mamie Clark in which black children were given a variety of dolls, including black and white ones, and were told to pick the "smarter" or "better" one. A majority of the black children chose the white dolls. Many of those interviewed believe that a distinct change to the educational system is necessary to change the mindset of people of African descent. The film affirms that "the kind of education that we have is to still enslave our minds, to make us believe we are inferior." Education should be the main weapon for the new generations of Africans and African descendants, to remind the world of the richness and struggle of African history.

At the end of the film, Africans are encouraged to remember their past, in order to move forward. The film promotes the idea that making it through enslavement should be a strength, not a weakness or something to be ashamed about; that the people who enslaved the Africans should be the ones that are ashamed. Essentially, the goal proposed is to teach African children a more African centered history, instead of a Eurocentric one. It further argues that teaching African-descent people about a history that is not their own will not help because they cannot relate to it. It also indicates that society must establish and promote African ideas and history in order to preserve what they want for future generations. The film calls for the ideas promoted within it to become mainstream so that there can be a better Africa and a better history associated with the continent.

== Cast ==
The cast features key figures from the African-American academic world.

- Maulana Karenga
- Francis Cress Welsing ("Academic")
- Paul Robeson Jr.
- Andrew Muhammad
- Kimani Nehusi
- Hakim Adi
- M. K. Asante Jr.
- Molefi Kete Asante
- Muhammed Shareef
- Esther Stanford
- Nelson George
- Bill Cosby (voice only)
- Amiri Baraka

== Awards and nominations ==
- 2005 Winner, Los Angeles Pan-African Film Festival, Best Documentary PAFF
- 2005 Winner, Bridgetown Film Festival, Best Documentary
- 2005 Winner, Berlin Black Film Festival, Best Film
- 2005 Winner, Harlem International Film Festival, Best International Documentary
- 2007 Winner, UNESCO/Zanzibar International Film Festival, "Breaking the Chains" award
- 2007 Nominated, FESPACO, Paul Robeson award "Best of the Diaspora"

== UNESCO award ==
500 Years Later is the first film to have won an UNESCO award for documenting slavery. The award was part of an UNESCO slave route project started in 1994: "The prize awarded $10,000 (~$21,722 in 2025) to a film that breaks the silence and speaks to the social, historical, economic and psychological impact of the slave trade; a film that raises public awareness of slavery's historical and contemporary manifestations; a film that gives voice to the dispossessed, reflects their perspectives and articulates their resistance to this dehumanization." UNESCO launched the Slave Route Project in 1994. This project seeks to increase knowledge and understanding in terms of slavery and historical events related to it.

== Reception ==
Kingsley Sheteh, from A Neo-Copernican Review, asserts that 500 Years Later is a step in the right direction in depicting the relationship between the Western world and Africa, showcasing the historically dependent and underdeveloped status of African countries. Shetah also pointed out that, although the movie does well with sensitive issues that are causes for Africa's problems, it fails to treat the issue of conflict. Shetah cites reasons that independent African state governments are heavily corrupted due to problems that can't simply be tied down to ideology, slavery, and colonialism. While not exactly presenting new information, the documentary's delivery of the material and evidence is refreshing, meant to promote discussion among groups of people.

Many critics received the film as a way to explore African history like never before. The film is a compilation of interviews that offer history from the perspective of people whose knowledge has been suppressed for years. 500 Years Later is applauded for its vast focus on African history, both the good and the bad.

Though successful, 500 Years Later received mixed reviews from critics regarding content and presentation. Dan Schindel, a documentary reviewer, calls the film "The Malcolm X to the MLK of the average doc that covers African-related material" and offers many examples of the extremity of the film. The article "Destroying the Horrors of 500 Years" by Attahiru Kawu-Bala praised the film as an "articulate multi-dimensional African world perspective" with regard to the effects of African Diaspora. Kawu-Bala argued that the techniques used in the documentary did not rely on emotion and instead used facts and truth to build a case from an African standpoint. By contrast, Curt Holman recognized the film's righteousness, but believed "a more informative film would have been more effective." He found the video to be emotionally charged and, at times, overly obvious. According to Holman, the emotional biases sometimes overshadowed the factual content.

Wanuri Kahiu, a Kenyan film director, states that the film is a discussion between the "greatest and most articulate thinkers of the African global nation." In her review of 500 Years Later, Kahiu wrote that the documentary should not be referred to as a film but rather an "audiovisual reference book" because of how informative the documentary is. According to Kahiu, 500 Years Later is a good resource to show the challenges people of African descent faced during the Diaspora and slavery and the challenges they still face today. She further states that the film is a great representation of the strength of African-American culture and citizenry, and claims that the movie is a call for African people to patiently work to rid the African world of the "defeatist nature" still subconsciously ingrained in them today.

== See also ==
- African holocaust
- African-American history
- Afrocentrism
- List of films featuring slavery
