= Maulana Karenga =

American creator of Kwanzaa (born 1941)

Maulana Ndabezitha Karenga
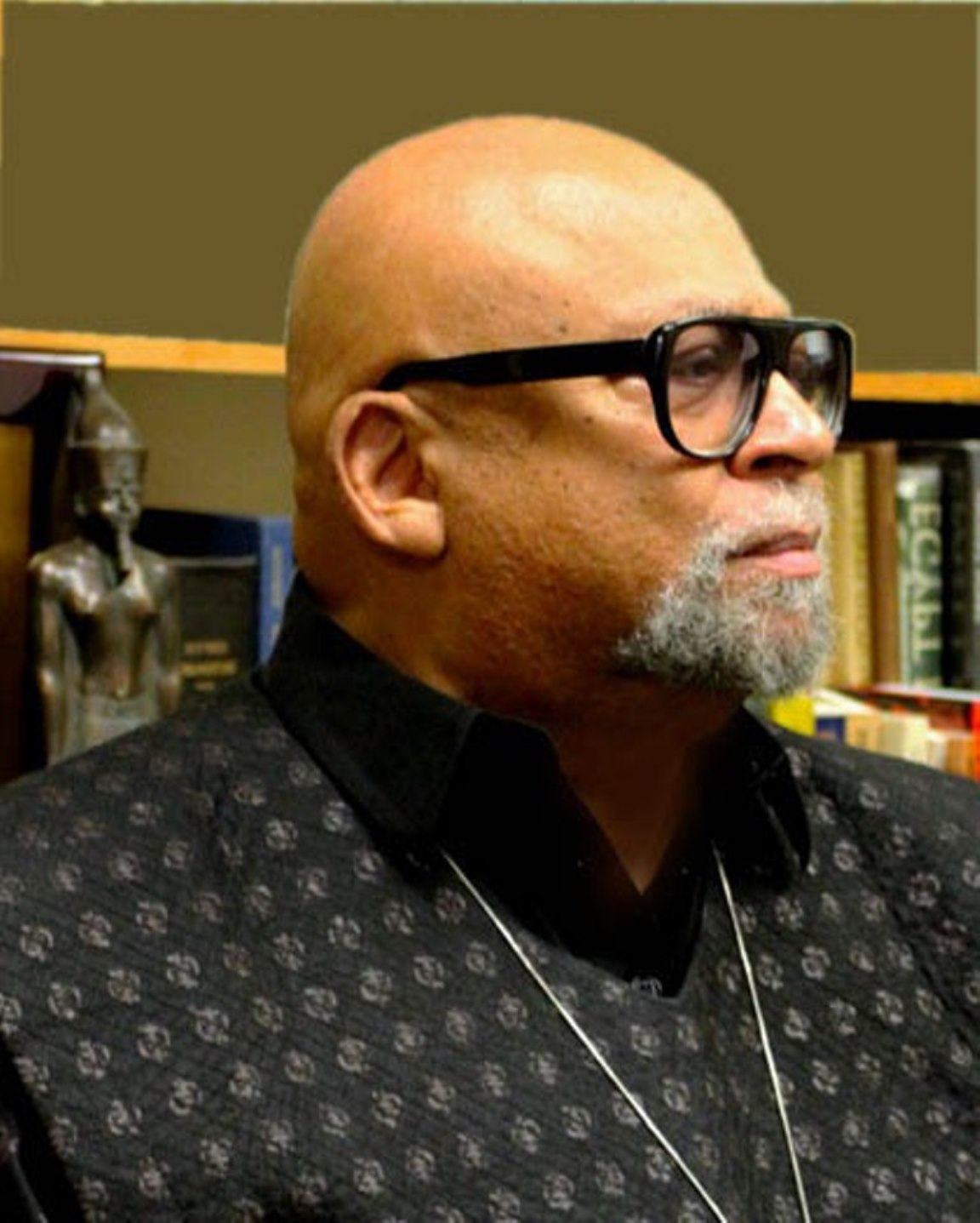
- Karenga in 2011
- Born: Ronald McKinley Everett; July 14, 1941 (age 85); Parsonsburg, Maryland, U.S.
- Other name: Ron Karenga
- Education: Los Angeles City College; UCLA (BA, MA); University of Southern California (PhD)
- Occupations: Author; activist; scholar
- Known for: Creator of pan-African and African-American holiday of Kwanzaa
- Spouse(s): Brenda Lorraine "Haiba" Karenga (divorced); Tiamoyo Karenga (1971–)
- Website: www.maulanakarenga.org

Maulana Ndabezitha Karenga (born Ronald McKinley Everett, July 14, 1941), previously known as Ron Karenga, is an American activist, author and professor of Africana studies, best known as the creator of the pan-African and African-American holiday of Kwanzaa.

Born in Parsonsburg, Maryland, to an African-American family, Karenga studied at Los Angeles City College and the University of California, Los Angeles. He was active in the Black Power movement of the 1960s, joining the Congress of Racial Equality and Student Nonviolent Coordinating Committee. In 1965, Karenga and Hakim Jamal co-founded the black nationalist group US Organization, which became involved in violent clashes with the Black Panther Party by 1969. In 1971, he was convicted of felony assault, torture, and false imprisonment of women. Karenga was imprisoned in California Men's Colony until he received parole in 1975.

In 1966, Karenga notably invented Kwanzaa, modeling the holiday after the African "first fruit" traditions. The rituals of the holiday promote African traditions, including the "seven principles of African heritage". During the early years of Kwanzaa, Karenga said it was meant to be a black alternative to Christmas. Karenga, a secular humanist, challenged the sanity of Jesus and declared Christianity a "White religion" that black people should shun. However, Karenga later changed his opinion, stating that Kwanzaa was not meant to provide people with an alternative to "their own religion or religious holiday".

Karenga has earned two doctorates: one in Political Science in 1976 and one in Social Ethics in 1994. He is a professor emeritus in the Africana Studies department at California State University, Long Beach, and has authored several books.

== Early life ==
Karenga was born in Parsonsburg, Maryland, the 14th child and seventh son in the family. His father, Levi Everett, was a tenant farmer and Baptist minister who employed the family to work fields under an effective sharecropping arrangement. Karenga moved to Los Angeles, California, in 1959, joining his older brother who was a teacher there, and attended Los Angeles City College. He became active with civil rights organizations Congress of Racial Equality and Student Nonviolent Coordinating Committee, took an interest in African studies, and was elected as LACC's first African-American student president.

After earning his associate degree, he matriculated into the University of California, Los Angeles (UCLA), and earned BA and MA degrees in political science. He studied Swahili, Arabic, and other African-related subjects. Among his influences at UCLA were Jamaican anthropologist and Negritudist Councill Taylor, who contested the Eurocentric view of alien cultures as primitive. During this period, he took the name Karenga (Swahili for "keeper of tradition") and the title Maulana (Swahili-Arabic for "master teacher").

== US Organization ==
The Watts riots broke out when Karenga was a year into his doctoral studies. The Black Congress (BC) was formed as a community-rebuilding organization in the aftermath. Within the BC, a discussion group centered on Black nationalist ideas, called the Circle of Seven, was formed, which included Hakim Jamal (a cousin of Malcolm X) and Karenga. The group published US Magazine (meaning "Us Black people") and in 1966 formed an organization called US. The organization joined in several community revival programs and was featured in press reports. Karenga cited Malcolm X's Afro-American Unity program as an influence on US Organization's work:

Malcolm was the major African American thinker that influenced me in terms of nationalism and Pan-Africanism. As you know, towards the end, when Malcolm is expanding his concept of Islam, and of nationalism, he stresses Pan-Africanism in a particular way. And he argues that, and this is where we have the whole idea that cultural revolution and the need for revolution, he argues that we need a cultural revolution, he argues that we must return to Africa culturally and spiritually, even if we can't go physically. And so that's a tremendous impact on US.

Karenga soon diverged from Malcolm X's ideas on Black nationalism and took US in a direction more focused on promoting African culture. Jamal and other adherents to Malcolm X's ideas left the group.

As racial disturbances spread across the country, Karenga appeared at a series of Black power conferences, joining other groups in urging the establishment of a separate political structure for African Americans. US developed a youth component with paramilitary aspects called the Simba Wachanga, which advocated and practiced community self-defense and service to the masses.

In 1966, Karenga founded the newspaper Harambee, which started as a newsletter for US and eventually became the newspaper for the Los Angeles Black Congress, an umbrella organization for several groups.

During the late 1960s, US Organization became bitter rivals with the Black Panther Party over their differing views on Black nationalism. The Federal Bureau of Investigation intensified this antipathy as part of its COINTELPRO operations, sending forged letters to each group which purported to be from the other group, so that each would believe that the other was publicly humiliating them. The rivalry came to a climax during 1969, with a series of armed confrontations and retaliatory shootings that left four Panthers dead, and more injured on both sides. A memorandum of the Los Angeles field office of the FBI dated May 26, 1970, confirmed that the surge of conflict suited their objectives and more would be encouraged:

It is intended that US, Inc. will be discreetly and appropriately advised of the time and locations of BPP activities in order that the two organizations might be brought together and thus grant nature the opportunity to take her due course.

According to Louis Tackwood, a former informant with the Los Angeles Police Department's Criminal Conspiracies Section and author of The Glass House Tapes, Ronald Karenga was knowingly provided financial, arms, and other support by LAPD, with Tackwood as liaison, for US operations against the Black Panthers. Karenga enjoyed a level of trust among figures in government, including LAPD Chief Thomas Reddin and California Governor Ronald Reagan.

== Kwanzaa ==
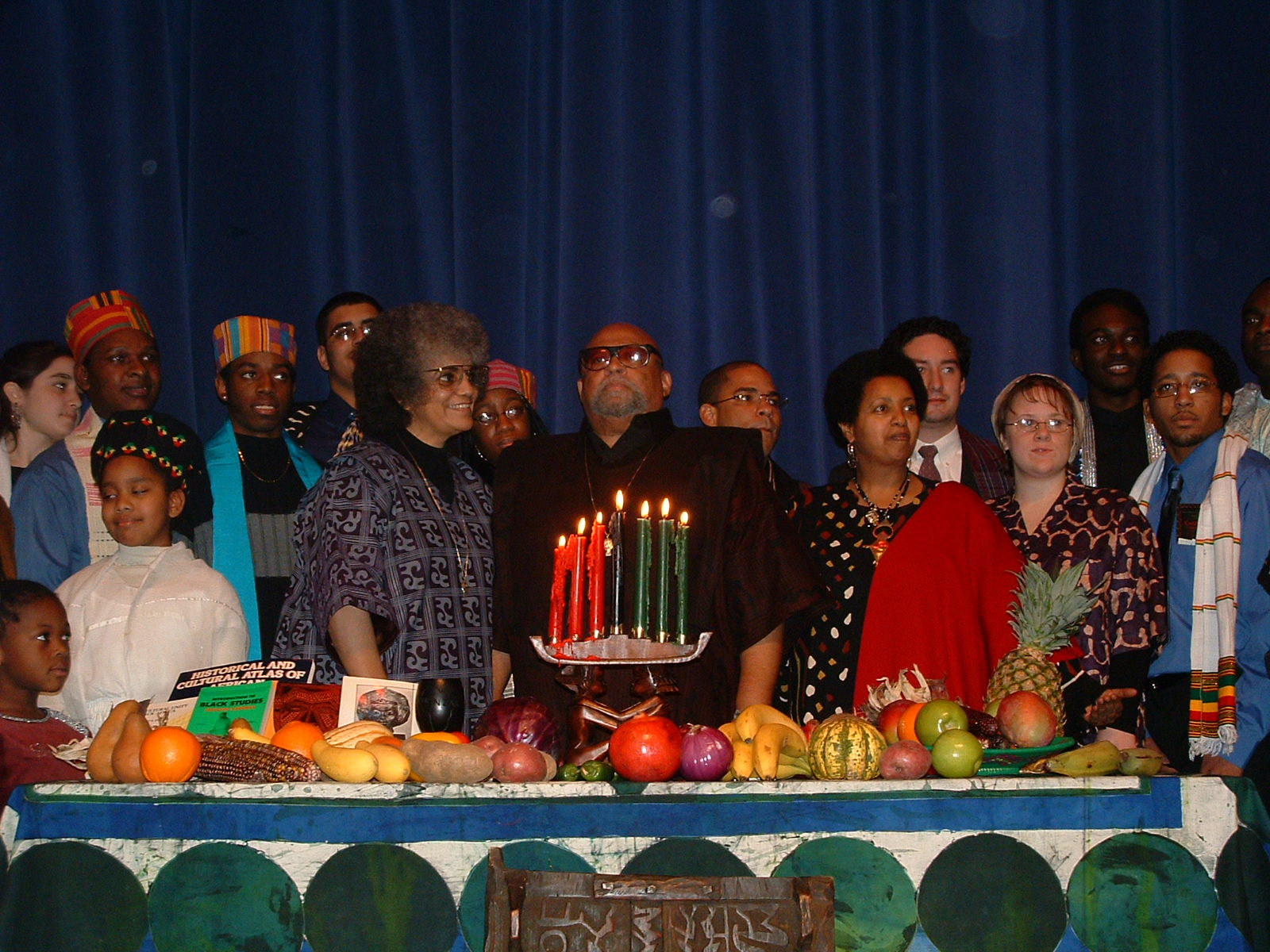
Karenga, center, with wife Tiamoyo at left, celebrating Kwanzaa at the Rochester Institute of Technology on December 12, 2003.

Karenga created Kwanzaa in 1966 to be the first pan-African holiday. Karenga said his goal was to "give Blacks an alternative to the existing holiday and give Blacks an opportunity to celebrate themselves and their history, rather than simply imitate the practice of the dominant society."

Kwanzaa is inspired by African "first fruit" traditions, and the name chosen is from Swahili, "matunda ya kwanza." The rituals of the holiday promote African traditions and Nguzo Saba, the "seven principles of African Heritage" that Karenga described as "a communitarian African philosophy":

- Umoja (unity)—To strive for and maintain unity in the family, community, nation, and race.
- Kujichagulia (self-determination)—To define ourselves, name ourselves, create for ourselves, and speak for ourselves.
- Ujima (collective work and responsibility)—To build and maintain our community together and make our brother's and sister's problems our problems and to solve them together.
- Ujamaa (cooperative economics)—To build and maintain our own stores, shops, and other businesses and to profit from them together.
- Nia (purpose)—To make our collective vocation the building and development of our community in order to restore our people to their traditional greatness.
- Kuumba (creativity)—To do always as much as we can, in the way we can, in order to leave our community more beautiful and beneficial than we inherited it.
- Imani (faith)—To believe with all our heart in our people, our parents, our teachers, our leaders, and the righteousness and victory of our struggle.

== Criminal conviction and imprisonment ==
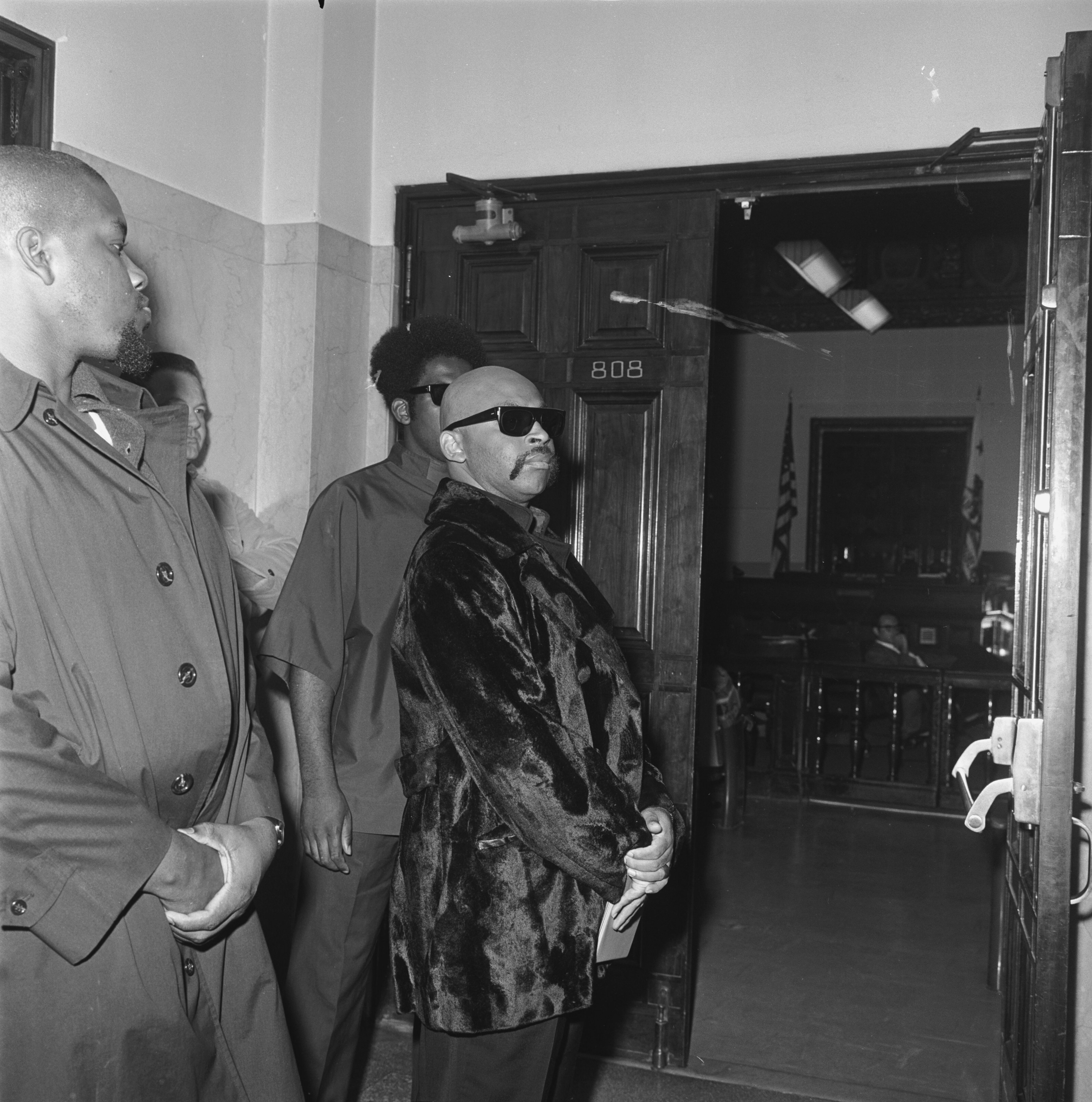
Karenga during his 1971 trial

In 1971, Karenga was sentenced to one to ten years in prison on counts of felony assault and false imprisonment. A May 14, 1971 article in the Los Angeles Times described the testimony of one of the women:

Deborah Jones, who once was given the Swahili title of an African queen, said she and Gail Davis were whipped with an electrical cord and beaten with a karate baton after being ordered to remove their clothes. She testified that a hot soldering iron was placed in Miss Davis' mouth and placed against Miss Davis' face and that one of her own big toes was tightened in a vise. Karenga, head of US, also put detergent and running hoses in their mouths, she said. They also were hit on the heads with toasters.

Jones and Brenda Karenga testified that Karenga believed the women were conspiring to poison him, which Davis has attributed to a combination of ongoing police pressure and his own drug abuse.

Karenga denied any involvement in the torture, and argued that the prosecution was political in nature. He was imprisoned at the California Men's Colony, where he studied and wrote on feminism, Pan-Africanism, and other subjects. The US Organization fell into disarray during his absence and was disbanded in 1974. After he petitioned several black state officials to support his parole on fair sentencing grounds, it was granted in 1975.

Karenga has declined to discuss the convictions with reporters and does not mention them in biographical materials. During a 2007 appearance at Wabash College, he again denied the charges and described himself as a former political prisoner.

== Later career ==
After his parole, Karenga re-established the US Organization under a new structure.

He was awarded his first PhD in leadership and human behavior in 1976 from United States International University (later merged into Alliant International University) for a dissertation titled "Afro-American Nationalism: Social Strategy and Struggle for Community". In 1977, he formulated a set of principles called Kawaida, a Swahili term for normal. Karenga called on African-Americans to adopt his secular humanism and reject other practices as mythical.

He was also the director of the Kawaida Institute for Pan African Studies and the author of several books, including his Introduction to Black Studies, a comprehensive Black/African Studies textbook now in its fourth edition (2010), originally published in 1982. He is also known for having co-hosted, in 1984, a conference that gave rise to the Association for the Study of Classical African Civilizations.

In 1994, he was awarded a second PhD in social ethics from the University of Southern California for a dissertation titled "Maat, the moral ideal in ancient Egypt: A study in classical African ethics." In 1995, he sat on the organizing committee and authored the mission statement of the Million Man March.

Karenga delivered a eulogy at the 2001 funeral service of New Black Panther Party leader Khalid Abdul Muhammad, praising him for his organizing activities and commitment to black empowerment. In 2002, scholar Molefi Kete Asante listed Maulana Karenga on his list of 100 Greatest African Americans.

As of 2023, Karenga chairs the Africana Studies Department at California State University, Long Beach.

== Films ==
- Owen Alik Shahadah's documentary 500 Years Later (2005) and its sequel Motherland (2010)
- M.K. Asante's documentary The Black Candle (2012)

== Published works ==
- Introduction to Black Studies. 2010, 4th edition, University of Sankore Press. ISBN 0943412307 (Editions: 1982, 1993, 2002, 2010)
- Kwanzaa: A Celebration of Family, Community and Culture. 1998. ISBN 0943412218
- Maat, The Moral Ideal in Ancient Egypt. ISBN 0415947537
- Odu Ifa: The Ethical Teachings. ISBN 0943412226
- Kawaida and Questions of Life and Struggle. ISBN 0943412293
- Selections from the Husia. ISBN 0943412064
- Book of Coming Forth By Day. ISBN 0943412145
- Handbook of Black Studies, co-edited with Molefi Kete Asante. ISBN 0761928405
- The Million Man March/Day of Absence: A Commemorative Anthology, co-edited with Haki Madhubuti. ISBN 0883781883
- Maulana Karenga: An Intellectual Portrait, Polity. ISBN 0745648282
