= Old City Hall, Westminster =

Municipal building in London, England

Old City Hall
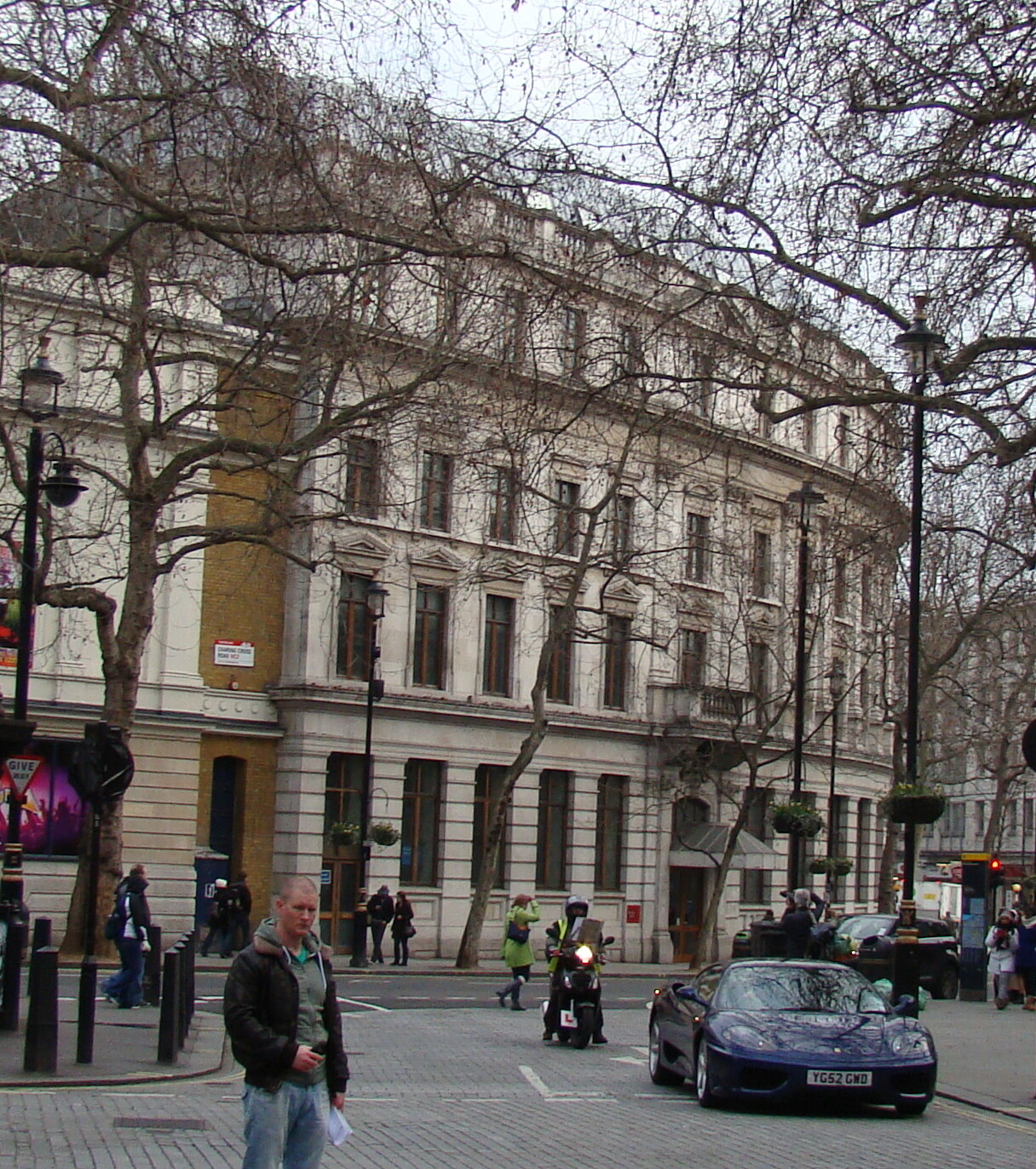
- The building in 2013

- Shown in Westminster
- 51.5097°N 0.1275°W
- Location: Charing Cross Road, Westminster

History
- Built: 1890

Site notes
- Architect: Robert Walker
- Architectural style: Neoclassical style

Listed Building – Grade II
- Official name: Cavell House National Westminster Bank
- Designated: 8 June 1982
- Reference no.: 1066286

The Old City Hall, also known as Cavell House and Pennine House, is a municipal building in Charing Cross Road in Westminster, London. The building, which is currently in commercial use, is a Grade II listed building.

== History ==
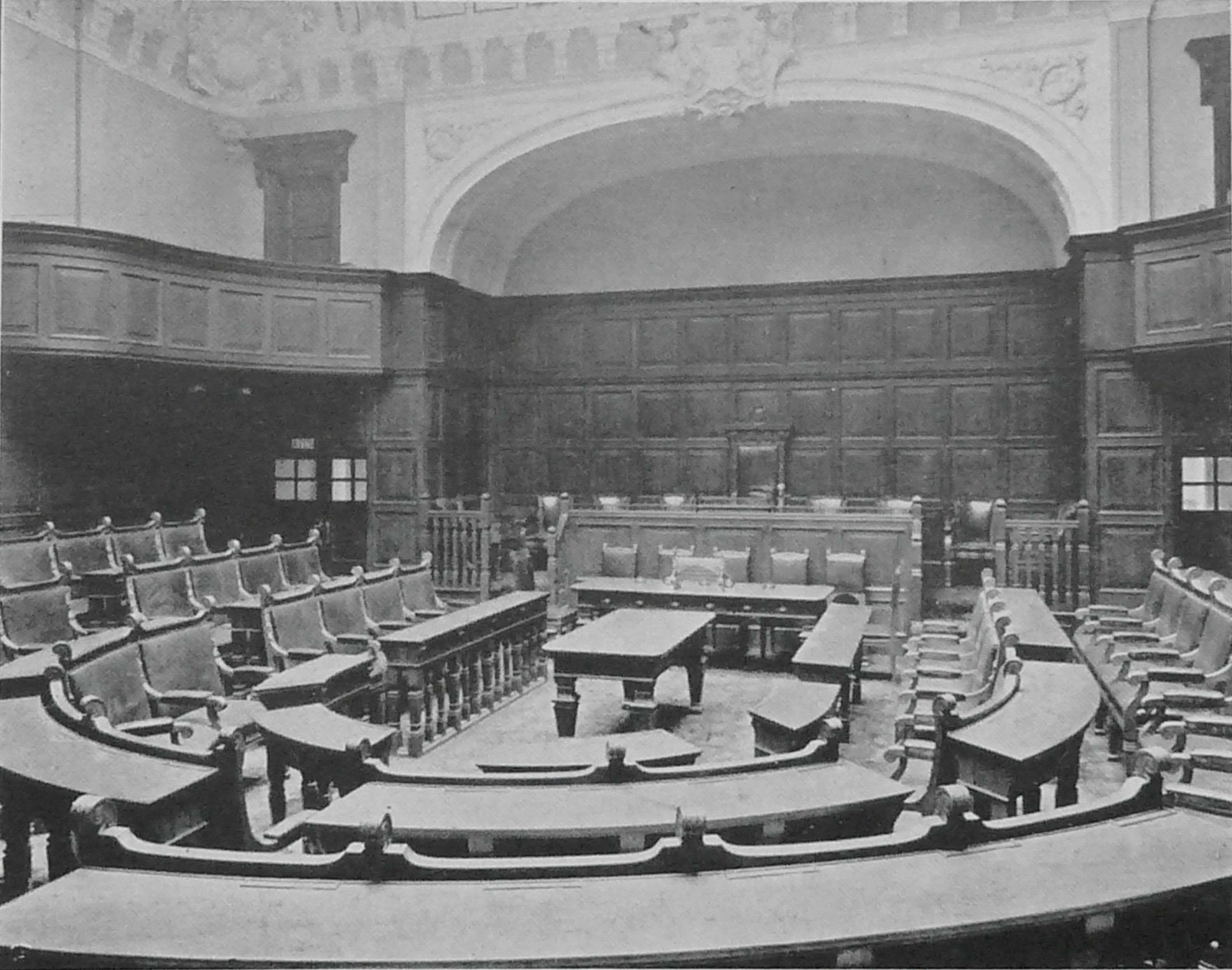
The council chamber

The building was commissioned as part of a project initiated by the Metropolitan Board of Works to redevelop the whole of the area bounded by two streets which were swept away as part of the process: Castle Street to the west and Hemmings Row to the south. The building was designed by Robert Walker in the neoclassical style, built in Portland stone and completed in 1890. It adjoined the Garrick Theatre which was completed around the same time.

The design involved a curved main frontage of 19 bays facing onto Charing Cross Road. The sixth bay on the left featured a segmental headed opening with a canopy flanked by Corinthian order pilasters supporting a first floor balcony. The ground floor was fenestrated by plain cross-windows, while the first floor was fenestrated by cross-windows with architraves and pediments and the second floor was fenestrated by cross windows with architraves and cornices. There was a modillioned cornice above the second floor and a further series of cross-windows at attic level surmounted by a balustraded parapet. The bays on the ground floor were separated by rusticated pilasters while the bays on the first and second floors were separated by Corinthian order pilasters.

In the late 19th century, the vestries of the parishes of St Margaret and St John held their meetings at the old Westminster Town Hall in Caxton Street. However, after the enlarged Metropolitan Borough of Westminster was formed in 1900, civic leaders decided the Caxton Street building was inadequate for their needs, and decided to find larger facilities. They selected the building in Charing Cross Road, which was renamed "Westminster City Hall", and enlargement works to meet the administrative requirements of the council were completed to a design by John Murray on 29 May 1902. Internally, the principal room was the council chamber, which was badly damaged by German bombing during the Second World War and was completely rebuilt in 1950.

The building was also used as a local polling station and the Prime Minister, Harold Macmillan, voted there during the general election in October 1959.

The building ceased to be the local seat of government when the new Westminster City Hall in Victoria Street was completed in 1965. It was subsequently converted for commercial use and became known as "Cavell House" to recall the nurse, Edith Cavell, whose memorial stands to the immediate south of the building. Following an extensive internal programme of refurbishment works, the building re-opened as "Pennine Place" in 2023.
