= Alice Kinloch =

South African human rights activist

Alice Kinloch (1863 – ?) was a South African human rights activist, public speaker, and writer, who co-founded the African Association in London in 1897 alongside Henry Sylvester Williams, Thomas Josiah Thompson, Charles Durham, and Reverend Henry Mason Joseph. Despite official membership of the African Association being limited only to "Black Men", Kinloch was the Association's first treasurer. Kinloch was the inspiration for, and an organiser of, the Pan-African Conference in London in 1900.

== Life ==
Alice Victoria Alexander Kinloch was born in Cape Town, Cape Colony, in 1863. Her family moved to Kimberley around the 1870s. In the month of June 1885, she married Edmund Ndosa Kinloch at St Cyprian's Church in Kimberley.

She travelled to the United Kingdom in 1895 and allied herself with the Aborigines Protection Society (APS), a leading abolitionist and human rights organization. As a representative of the APS, she spoke to large audiences in London, Newcastle, York, and Manchester. On platforms in Britain, she discussed conditions in South Africa. Her topic was the "ill treatment of the indigenous people throughout South Africa, particularly the Compound System found throughout the mining districts".

Later, in 1897, she published a pamphlet titled "Are South African Diamonds Worth Their Cost?". As part of that report, she described conditions of life on mining compounds as "slave-like" and argued against pass laws in Natal. This pamphlet has been suggested to be one of the first instances of an African woman publishing her views on African exploitation, in Britain.

Kinloch formed the African Association in 1897 with aspirant lawyers Henry Sylvester Williams and Thomas Josiah Thompson from Trinidad and Sierra Leone. As treasurer of the African Association, Kinloch returned to South Africa in February 1898 and, with the African Association, organised the first Pan-African Conference in 1900. Williams stated that "the Association is the result of Mrs Kinloch's work in England and the feeling that as British Subjects we ought to be heard in our own affairs."

Kinloch is quoted as saying: "With some men of my race in this country, I have formed a society for the benefit of our people in Africa by helping them to bring some of the dark side of things in Africa and elsewhere to light."
