= Anna H. Jones =

Canadian-born American suffragist (1855–1932)

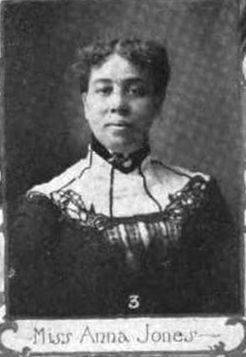
- Anna H. Jones in a 1902 publication
- Born: Anna Holland Jones; September 2, 1855; Chatham, Canada West
- Died: March 7, 1932 (aged 76); Monrovia, California, U.S.
- Education: Oberlin College
- Occupations: Educator, suffragist

Anna H. Jones (September 2, 1855 – March 7, 1932) was a Canadian-born American clubwoman, suffragist, and educator based in later life in Kansas City, Missouri.

== Early life ==
Anna Holland Jones was born on September 2, 1855, in Chatham, Canada West, the daughter of Emily Francis Jones and James Monroe Jones. Her father was one of the first black graduates of Oberlin College, finishing in 1849. Her father was a gunsmith and engraver who, with his brother Elias Toussaint Jones, was involved with John Brown's Canadian abolition activities. Anna H. Jones attended university in Michigan, and graduated from Oberlin College in 1875. She achieved a degree in English.

Her sister Sophia Bethena Jones (1857–1932) became a medical doctor, and "the first black faculty member at Spelman College" and founder of the school's nursing program. Her sister Fredericka Florence Jones (1860-–) also became a teacher.

== Career ==
Anna H. Jones taught elocution at Wilberforce University in Ohio from 1885 to 1892. She taught high school and was a school principal in Kansas City, Missouri, until 1916, when she retired from classroom work.

In 1892, Jones accepted a teaching position at Lincoln High School in Kansas City, Missouri. Jones taught English and English Literature at Lincoln.

She was president of the Missouri Association of Colored Women's Clubs from 1903 to 1906. She raised the money to build a YMCA in Kansas City. She represented the Kansas City Colored Women's League in the talks that resulted in the creation of the National Association of Colored Women's Clubs. She wrote three biographical sketches for Hallie Q. Brown's Homespun Heroines and Other Women of Distinction (1926).

Jones traveled to London in 1900 for the First Pan-African Conference, in the company of Anna Julia Cooper, Fannie Barrier Williams, and Ella D. Barrier, among others. Jones and Cooper were the only two African-American women to address the Conference; Jones presented a paper titled "The Preservation of Race Individuality." She later corresponded with W. E. B. DuBois. In 1905 her two-part essay "A Century's Progress for the American Colored Woman" appeared in consecutive issues of Voice of the Negro magazine. Her short essay "Women Suffrage and Social Reform" appeared in a 1915 issue of The Crisis. Jones was a member of Alpha Kappa Alpha sorority.

Katherine D. Tillman wrote a poem about Jones, titled "My Queen".

== Personal life ==
After 1892, Jones moved to Kansas City, Missouri and eventually purchased a shirt-waste style house on 2444 Montgall Avenue. In 1919, she sold her Montgall home to her colleague, John Bluford, and left Kansas City.

Jones moved to Monrovia, California, in 1921. She died there on March 7, 1932, aged 76. The Anna H. Jones Colored Women's Club was organized in Monrovia in 1932, in her memory.
