= Westminster City Hall =

Municipal building in London, England

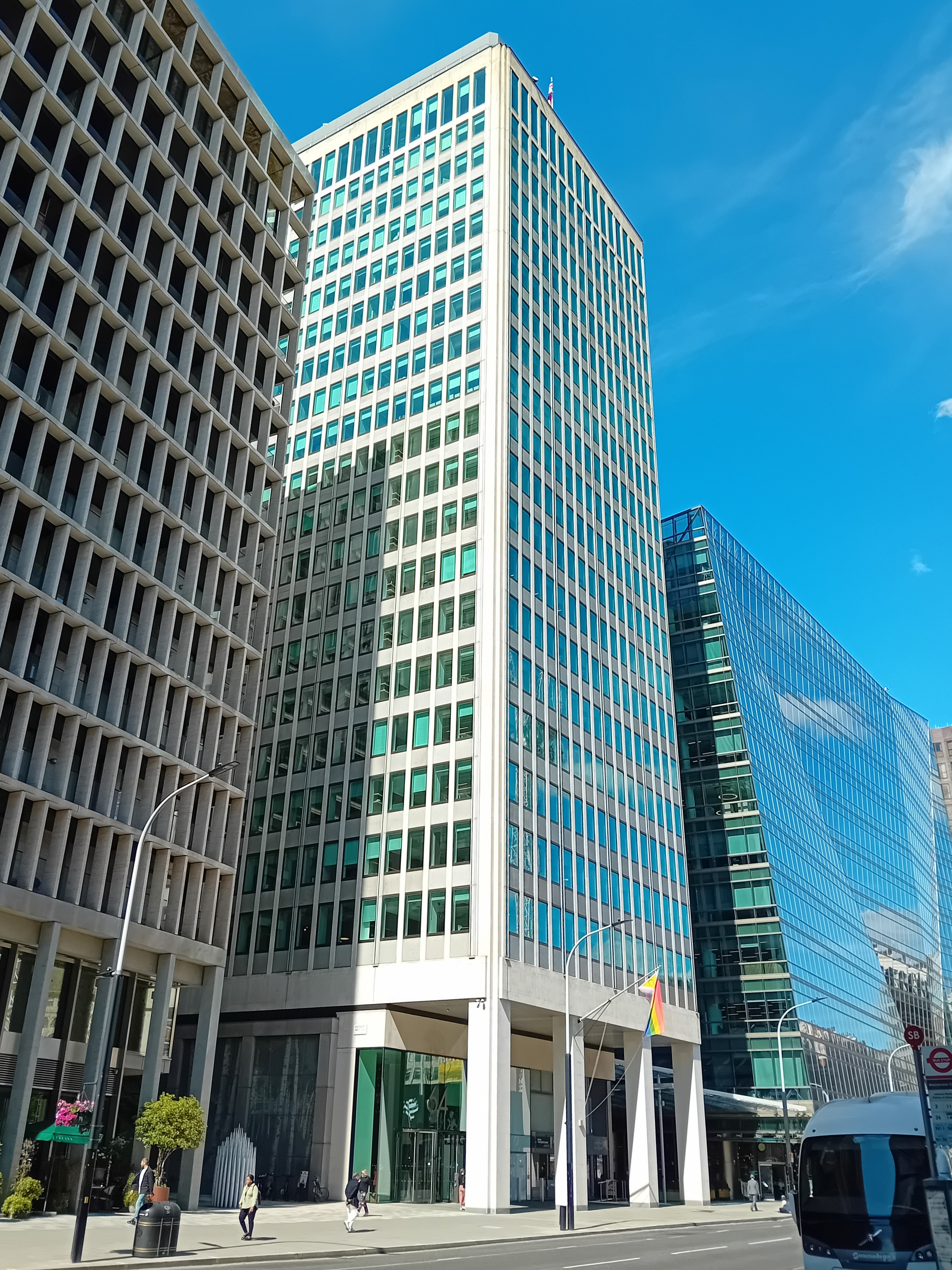
- Westminster City Hall

- Shown in Westminster
- 51.4976°N 0.1374°W
- Location: 64 Victoria Street, Westminster

History
- Built: 1965

Site notes
- Architect: Burnet Tait & Partners
- Architectural style: Modern style

Westminster City Hall is a municipal building in Victoria Street in Westminster, London. It is the headquarters of Westminster City Council.

== History ==
In the late 19th century the parishes of St Margaret and St John held their meetings at the old Westminster Town Hall in Caxton Street. However, after the enlarged Metropolitan Borough of Westminster was formed in 1900, civic leaders decided the Caxton Street building was inadequate for their needs, and decided to find larger facilities; they selected an existing building in Charing Cross Road, which re-opened as "Westminster City Hall" on 29 May 1902.

In the early 1960s, in anticipation of the impending further enlargement of the council's area, civic leaders again decided they needed larger facilities; the site they selected formed part of a larger development by Land Securities on a site previously occupied by Prince's Mansions in Victoria Street. (Note: Prince's Mansions was a large block of apartments, of a type known locally as "mansion flats", designed by Enoch Basset Keeling and completed in 1882.) The proposed development was a 76.20 metres (250.0 ft) high, 20-storey glass tower, designed by Burnet Tait & Partners in the modern style, which was built by Taylor Woodrow Construction. The enlarged City of Westminster was formed in March 1965, shortly before the completion of the new town hall in April 1965.

Initially, Westminster City Council only used the 20th floor, but gradually expanded to take the whole building. The principal rooms were the Mayor's parlour on the 19th floor and the committee rooms on the 18th floor, which were used for cabinet meetings as well as committee meetings.

The building was stripped back to a concrete shell during an extensive refurbishment between 2017 and 2019.
