= Henry Sylvester Williams =

Trinidadian politician, lawyer and writer (1869–1911)

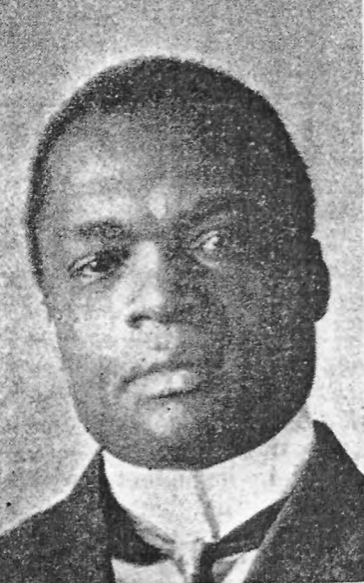
- S. Williams (1905) by E.H. Mills
- Born: 15 February 1869; Arouca, Trinidad
- Died: 26 March 1911 (aged 42); Trinidad and Tobago
- Occupation: Barrister
- Known for: Pan-Africanism

Henry Sylvester Williams (24 March 1867 or 15 February 1869 – 26 March 1911) was a Trinidadian lawyer, activist, councillor and writer who was among the founders of the Pan-African movement.

As a young man, Williams travelled to the United States and Canada to further his education, before subsequently moving to England, where he founded the African Association along with Alice Kinloch and Thomas Josiah Thompson in 1897 to "promote and protect the interests of all subjects claiming African descent, wholly or in part, in British colonies and other place, especially Africa, by circulating accurate information on all subjects affecting their rights and privileges as subjects of the British Empire, by direct appeals to the Imperial and local Governments."

In 1900, Williams organised the First Pan-African Conference, held at Westminster Town Hall in London. In 1903 he went to practise as a barrister in Southern Africa, becoming the first black man to be called to the bar in the Cape Colony.

== Early life ==
The date and place of birth for Williams is contested. He was born 24th March 1867, Endeavour, St. James, Barbados or in 1869 in Arouca, Trinidad, He was the eldest son of Elizabeth Payne and Henry Bishop Williams, a Carpenter (wheelwright) (Barbados Church Registers) from Barbados. Williams grew up in Arouca, a village where the majority of residents were of African descent. He attended the Arouca School, which at the time was run by a Chinese Trinidadian known as Stoney Smith.

Williams started his working life at the age of 17, becoming a teacher with a Class III Certification, and in 1887 he was posted to the government school in San Fernando. According to the records, he was one of only three teachers with certificates in that year. A year later he was the only certified teacher at the school in Canaan, just south of San Fernando; and the following year he was transferred to San Juan, where he remained until he left Trinidad in 1891. A cultured man, he was also qualified to teach singing and played the piano regularly.

In January 1890, Williams became a founding member of the Trinidad Elementary Teachers Union. The feature address was given by Chief Justice Sir John Gorrie, was in favour of reform in government and was constantly at odds with the white ruling class. He frequently gave judgments against the establishment and was so beloved by the man in the street that he was known as "Papa Gorrie". Williams exhorted the teachers to act as professionals. This is a free country, he reminded them, even if it is a Crown Colony. Gorrie undoubtedly would have influenced his thinking.

Around that time, one of Williams' acquaintances, a coloured lawyer named Edgar Maresse Smith, petitioned the Governor to declare 1 August a holiday for the celebration of Emancipation. Robinson did not support it but Gorrie did. Even at that time, there was in Trinidad a highly educated, articulate and race-conscious group of black men, among them John Jacob Thomas, Maresse Smith, Mzumbo Lazare, C. E. Petioni, the Reverend Phillip Henry Douglin. Thomas particularly was famous for his book Froudacity (1889), in which he refuted and questioned the view espoused by Oxford historian James Anthony Froude that black people could not be entrusted with self-government. Thomas's ideas certainly inspired Williams.

In 1891 Williams went to New York City, but could only get work shining shoes. He moved in 1893 to Dalhousie University, in Halifax, Nova Scotia, to study for a law degree. While living in Canada, Henry became a co-founder of the pioneering and innovative Coloured Hockey League (1895–1936), featuring teams from Nova Scotia, New Brunswick and Prince Edward Island.

In 1895, he went to London and entered King's College London, but although it is known he studied there, there is no record of his enrolment at that time.

In his book on the life of Williams, Owen Mathurin notes: "Williams was not as fortunate as some of his fellow Trinidadians who had come to study for professions at the expense of wealthy parents or as young winners of a government scholarship who received singular remittances." It was therefore not until 1897 he enrolled as a student of Gray's Inn to read for the bar. He satisfied the entrance requirements by passing a preliminary examination in Latin, English and History.

Williams wrote to newspapers and journals on matters touching on Pan-African interests and during this time earned some money through lecturing for the Church of England Temperance Society. This took him to all parts of the British Isles speaking under the auspices of parish churches. He also lectured on thrift for the National Thrift Society whose chairman, Dr Greville Walpole, wrote that Williams's "heroic struggle to make ends meet won his admiration because the little he was able to earn by his lectures simply defrayed the cost of living."

The then 29-year-old Williams became friendly with 32-year-old Agnes Powell, who worked as a secretary with the Temperance Society. She was the eldest of a family of three sons and four daughters of Captain Francis Powell of Kent, who was prominent in local Masonic and Conservative political circles. Williams and Agnes Powell married in 1898 in the face of the strongest opposition of her father, who refused to give his consent and thereafter refused to receive Williams. They had five children; the first, Henry Francis Sylvestre, was born the following year.

== Henry Sylvester Pan-African perspective ==
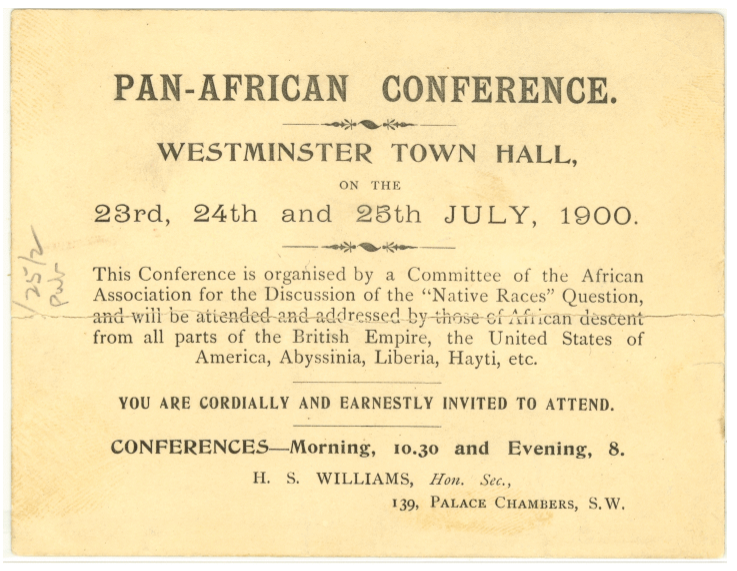
Invitation to Pan-African Conference at Westminster Town Hall, London, July 1900

Some time after June 1897, Williams formed the African Association (later called the Pan-African Association). His good friend, Trinidad attorney Emmanuel Mzumbo Lazare, who at the time was in London taking part in Queen Victoria's 60th anniversary celebrations as an officer of the Trinidad Light Infantry Volunteers, mentioned to Williams a South African woman, Mrs A. V. Kinloch, whom Lazare had heard discuss "under what oppressions the black races of Africa lived" at a meeting of the Writers' Club in London. Williams himself subsequently met Kinloch, who was touring Britain on behalf of the Aborigines' Protection Society (APS), speaking in particular about South Africa. The meeting of these minds resulted in the formation of the African Association. Stating that "the time has come when the voice of Black men should be heard independently in their own affairs", Williams gave his first address as honorary general secretary in the common-room at Gray's Inn, and Kinloch was the association's first treasurer.

Some English people felt the Association would not last three months but by 1900 Williams was ready to hold the first Pan-African Conference (subsequent gatherings were known as Congresses). The three-day gathering took place at Westminster Town Hall on 23, 24, and 25 July with delegates comprising "men and women of African blood and descent" from West and South Africa, the West Indies, the United States and Liberia. W. E. B. Du Bois, who was to become the movement's torchbearer at subsequent Pan-African Congresses, was a participant and his Address to the Nations with its prophetic statement "The problem of the twentieth century is the problem of the colour-line" came to be regarded as the defining statement of the conference.

After this Williams set about spreading the word and he embarked on lecture tours to set up branches in Jamaica, Trinidad and the United States. On 28 June 1901 the Trinidad branch of the Pan African Association was formed, with branches in Naparima, Sangre Grande, Arima, Manzanilla, Tunapuna, Arouca and Chaguanas. He spent two months here and after his departure for the US even more local branches were formed. However, after this the profile of the Association suffered because he was not able to give it his full attention.

Returning to London that year, he published a monthly journal called the Pan-African, which lasted only a few issues. He finished his bar exams and, like Mahatma Gandhi around the same time, went on to practise in South Africa, staying there from 1903 to 1905. Williams was the first black man to be admitted to the bar in the Cape Colony, on 29 October 1903, having presented to the court in Cape Town a certificate issued on 20 September confirming his credentials:

Mr. Sylvester Williams was admitted as a barrister in the Supreme Court of Cape Colony last month. He is a West Indian. He was educated for the most part at Dalhousie University, Canada, where he spent eight years and took his degree. Afterwards he became a member of Gray's Inn, London. He has practised for several years in London, mainly at the Old Bailey. – Indian Opinion, 12 November 1903.

He knew that non-whites were badly treated, but still he took this step. He was soon agitating for the rights of blacks. He also presided over the opening of a coloured preparatory school staffed by West Indians. He was eventually boycotted by the Cape Law Society for it was felt he was "preaching seditious doctrines to the natives against the white man".

== Return to London ==
On his return to London, Williams decided to run for public office, as he felt there should be an African spokesman in Parliament and his South African experience had given him the knowledge he needed to speak competently on these affairs. The blacks and coloureds were "my people" and on his arrival he gave the Colonial Office his views. "We should not be deprived of equal justice because of the colour of our skins," he said.

Williams joined the Fabian Society and the National Liberal Club, but did not make it to Parliament. He became involved in municipal politics and won a seat as a Progressive on Marylebone Borough Council in November 1906. He and John Archer were among the first people of African descent to be elected to public office in Britain.

However, service as a councillor did not take him away from his interest in and devotion to Africa. He became involved with Liberian affairs and went there in 1908 at the invitation of president Arthur Barclay.

In 1908, he returned to Trinidad, where he rejoined the bar and practised until his death four years later.

Williams died on 26 March 1911, at the age of 42. He was buried at Lapeyrouse Cemetery, Port of Spain.

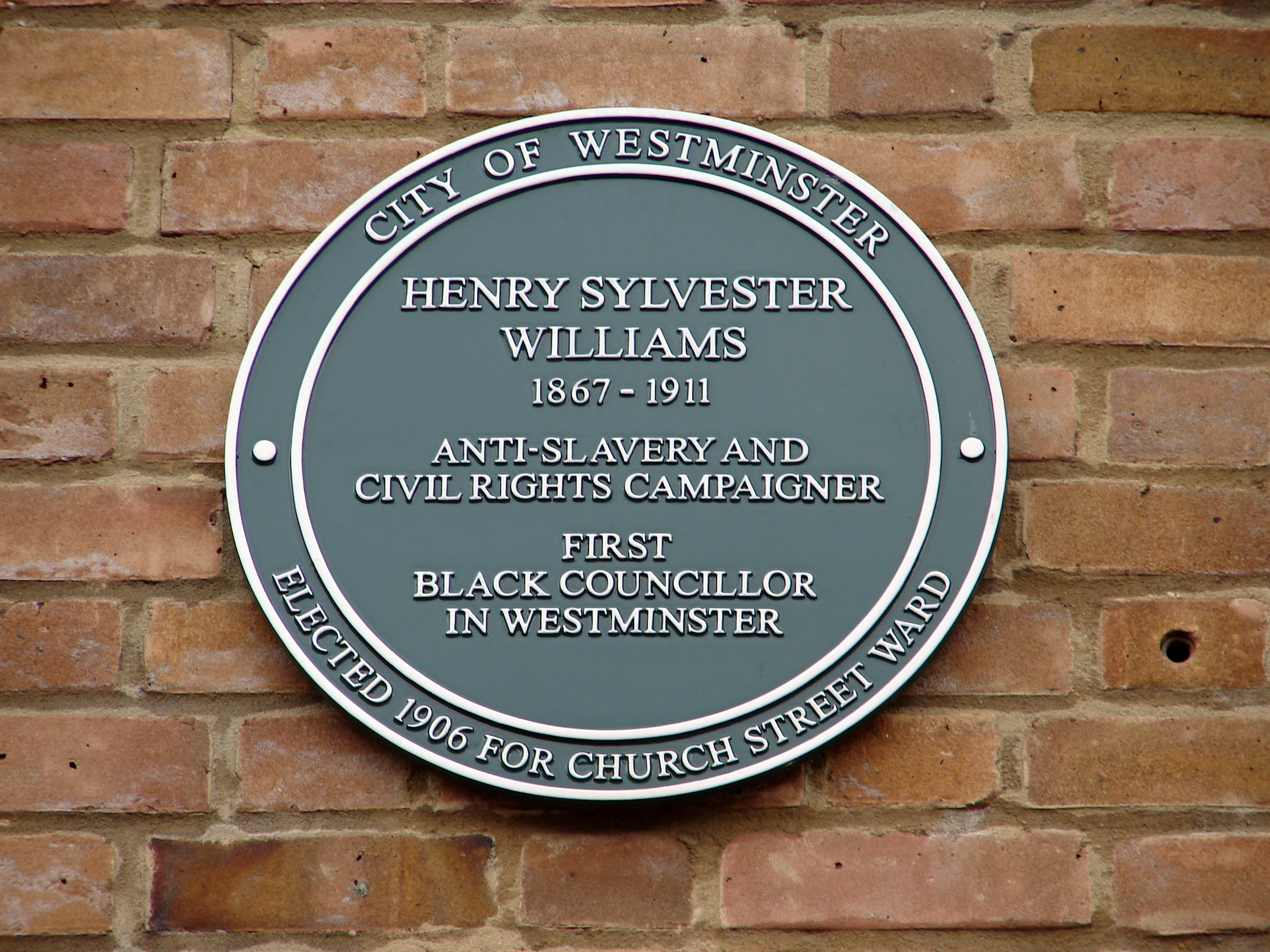
38 Church Street, London, NW8

== Legacy ==
The University of the West Indies, St. Augustine, Trinidad and Tobago, held a conference on "Henry Sylvester Williams and Pan-Africanism: A Retrospection and Projection" on 7–12 January 2001.

A memorial plaque on the site of his former London home at 38 Church Street, Marylebone, was unveiled on 12 October 2007.

Williams was named 16th on a 2003 list of the "100 Great Black Britons".
