= Emmanuel Mzumbo Lazare =

Trinidad and Tobago politician (1864–1929)

Emmanuel Lazare (1864–1 January 1929) was an African-Trinidadian lawyer and social activist, who was known as Mzumbo Lazare (the forename sometimes spelled M'zumbo or Mazumbo) after he chose to adopt an African name to show his pride in his heritage. Maureen Warner-Lewis writes that the fact that "Lazare appropriated, or condoned the use of, an overtly African designation....was a symbol of his identification with black people and the poor. He was a defender of their rights, joined the Pan-African Association founded in 1901 in England by fellow Trinidadian Henry Sylvester Williams, and became a moving spirit behind democratic political reforms at the turn of the twentieth century."

== Biography ==
Born in Trinidad to migrants from Guadeloupe, Lazare was educated in Port of Spain at two of the leading schools there, the Boys' Model School and St Thomas Roman Catholic School, as well as at either Queen's Royal College or CIC.

Lazare became an articled clerk with the French creole solicitor Andre Maingot, going on to be the first Trinidadian to pass the local examination of the Incorporated Law Society of England, without going abroad, and qualify as a solicitor in 1895. He later became a barrister.

He joined the part-time Volunteer Corps of Trinidad, the only black officer, and represented the Corps at Queen Victoria's Diamond Jubilee celebrations in London in 1897. On meeting him the Queen asked whether he spoke English, and Lazare famously replied: “Yes, Ma’am, in the West Indies we all speak English.” Lazare was decorated by the Queen and received the royal message to the colony, an event reported in the local, regional and British press.

He became a close associate of Henry Sylvester Williams and was vice-president of the Trinidad branch of the Pan-African Association, which had been founded in London by Williams after the First Pan-African Conference to challenge paternalism, racism and imperialism. Very successful in his law career, Lazare wanted to make a wider contribution to his country and to encourage racial pride among his people. He became involved in local politics, and played a leading role in the campaign against Crown Colony government that culminated in the 1903 Water Riots in Port of Spain in 1903. This led to him being prosecuted but the jury took little time to find him not guilty. Lazare was elected to the Port of Spain City Council in 1914, and in 1920 was appointed to the Legislative Council. At his death in 1929 he was much respected as a hero and role model.

== Legacy ==
In 1947, in protest about the treatment of black people in Bermuda, parliamentarian and civil-rights activist Dr Edgar Fitzgerald Gordon changed his name to "Mazumbo", saying that this new name derived from "a famous West African chieftain, who had once been received by Queen Victoria".

=== Emancipation Day ===
In 1887 Lazare made an initial request to the colonial authorities that 1 August 1888 be made a public holiday called Emancipation Day, to commemorate the emancipation of the slaves. After this was not successful, to strengthen his appeal he organised a large meeting on 18 June 1888, at Chacon Street, Port of Spain, and with other influential Africans drew up a petition that argued: "If patriotic subjects celebrate their Queen's accession to the throne, then surely they should celebrate the landmark of British Humanitarianism, the abolition of slavery!" It was signed by thousands and sent to the Governor, Sir William Robinson, and although this attempt also failed, after much agitation from the public 1 August was eventually declared a public holiday. It was replaced by "Discovery Day", but in 1984 Emancipation Day was again declared a public holiday, celebrated on 1 August.
