= Sophia B. Jones =

Florida-born American medical doctor (1857–1932)

- Born: Sophia Bethena Jones; May 16, 1857; Chatham, Canada West
- Died: September 9, 1932 (aged 75)
- Education: University of Michigan Medical School
- Occupations: Physician, educator
- Employer: Spelman College
- Notable work: Fifty Years of Negro Public Health, published in 1913
- Father: James Monroe Jones
- Relatives: Anna H. Jones (sister)

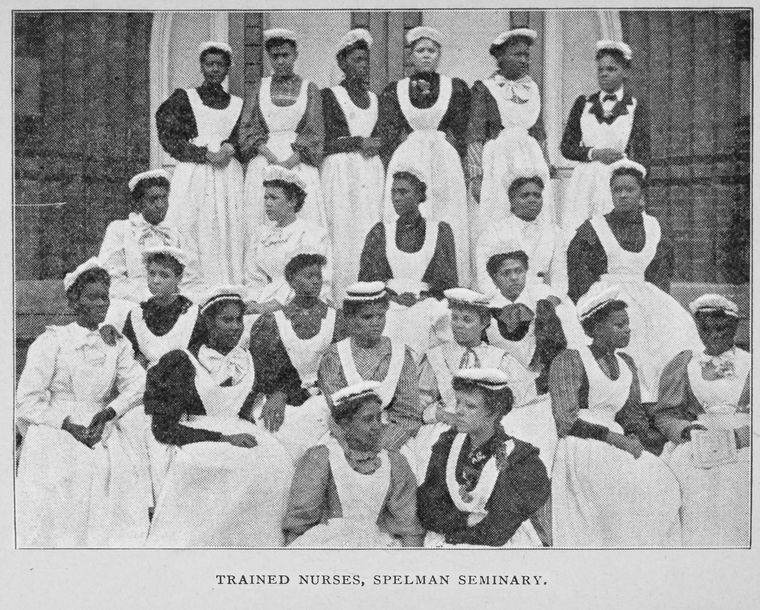
Nurses at Spelman College Seminary in 1897

Sophia Bethena Jones (May 16, 1857 – September 9, 1932) was a British North America-born American medical doctor and the first woman of African descent to graduate from the University of Michigan Medical School. She founded the Nursing Program at Spelman College, where she was the first black faculty member.

== Early life ==
Sophia Bethena Jones was born in Chatham, Canada West, the daughter of James Monroe Jones and Emily F. Francis Jones. Her father, who was a gunsmith by trade, was born in North Carolina and was one of the first African-American graduates of Oberlin College. He was born into an enslaved family and purchased their freedom in 1843. In the year Sophia was born, he was involved with John Brown's abolition activities in Canada West.

Jones had three sisters: Anna Jones, Fredericka Jones, and Emma Jones, and two brothers: George Jones and James Jones. Her sisters Anna H. Jones (1855–1932) and Fredericka F. Jones (1860–1905) both became teachers.

Sophia B. Jones began her medical education at the University of Toronto, but she found its options for women wanting to study medicine limiting. Jones left to attend the University of Michigan Medical School, finishing in 1885 as the school's first female graduate of African descent.

== Career ==
Sophia B. Jones became the first faculty member of African descent at Spelman College when she was hired in 1885. While at Spelman, she organized the school's nurses training program and led their infirmary.

After her time at Spelman, Jones worked at Wilberforce University, and practiced medicine in St. Louis, Philadelphia, and Kansas City. She also earned a patent in 1890 for a "Barrel trunk."

Jones had a passion for prioritizing public health and health equity. Her article "Fifty Years of Public Negro Health" was published in 1913. This article attempted to explain the causes of increased mortality among African Americans after emancipation, such as increased infant mortality and an increase in cases of tuberculosis. In this article, she also advocated for more black doctors and nurses as a method of reducing mortality rates among African Americans, saying of black nurses: "Not only to her own race has she been of service, but also to the white race."

== Personal life ==
Late in life, Jones retired with her sister Anna to Monrovia, California, where they ran an orange grove. Sophia and Anna both died in 1932; Sophia B. Jones was 75 years old.

== Legacy ==
The University of Michigan Medical School offers a lectureship in infectious diseases named for Sophia B. Jones. There is also a Fitzbutler Jones Alumni Society, an organization established to provide financial support to students and faculty by black alumni in 1997. They honor Jones and the school's first black graduate, William Henry Fitzbutler. There is also a conference room at Michigan named for Dr. Jones.

== See also ==
- Ludie Clay Andrews
- Spelman College
- Historically black colleges and universities
- Women in medicine
- List of African-American women in medicine
- List of African-American women in STEM fields
