= Pan African Association =

Organization of African leaders

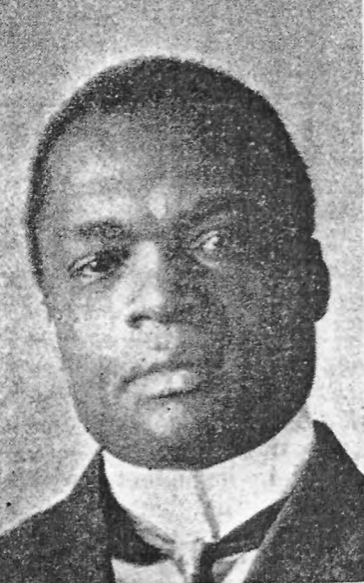
Henry Sylvester Williams, one of the founders of the Pan African Association

The African Association, known as the Pan-African Association after 1900, was an organization formed by leaders of African descent to "promote and protect the interests of all subjects claiming African descent, wholly or in part, in British colonies and other place, especially Africa, by circulating accurate information on all subjects affecting their rights and privileges as subjects of the British Empire, by direct appeals to the Imperial and local Governments." Henry Sylvester Williams initiated the creation of the African Association, which was formalized on 14 September 1897, at its headquarters in London, England. The Association is best known for organizing the First Pan-African Conference, which took place in London in July 1900.

== Goals ==
The African Association initially focused on providing information on rights and privileges for Africans who were subjects of the British Empire. Recognizing the need for an inclusion of African individuals on a global scale, the association shifted its aspirations in 1899, establishing itself as an international association to promote the rights of Africans across the world, rather than just the British Empire. The African Association listed its goals:

1. Promote unity
2. Improve relations amongst Africans
3. Promote the interests of Africans
4. Circulate information to teach Africans about their rights and privileges
5. Inform the British public about occurrences in other parts of the world
6. Inform people of, and potentially change laws for blacks in South Africa

== Development ==
=== Early formation ===
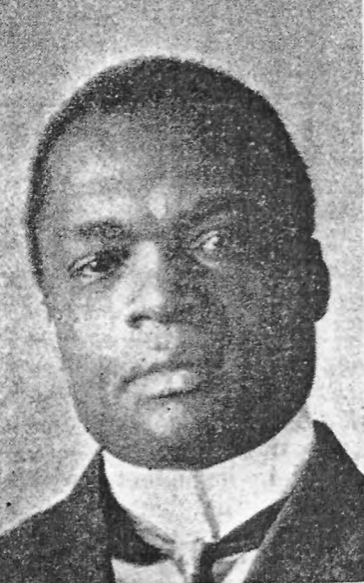
Henry Sylvester Williams, ca. 1905

Liberation leaders and activists recognized the need for an international association to unite anti-imperialist and black liberation efforts across nations. To this end, Henry Sylvester Williams, a Trinidadian lawyer, recognized the need to focus on educating the British public. He believed the British public was unaware of the sub-standard treatment of people of colour throughout the Empire, and sought to rectify this via the formation of the association. Williams sought to establish the association in London, as the city had become the locus of anti-imperialist movements, activism, and organization. Despite the comparatively progressive character of metropolitan London, white sympathizers advised against the founding of the African Association, claiming that black people were not capable of forming independent political organisations. Because of this conflict, active membership was restricted to black people but “white” individuals could become honorary members.

In addition to general desire for the African Association, contemporary political events spurred its creation. The founders argued that British colonial governments were creating a "new form of slavery" in Zanzibar and East Africa. A letter from A. Kinloch, printed in The Friend, the journal of the Society of Friends, on 22 October 1897, suggested that the association may have taken conditions in South Africa into account as well.

=== First meeting ===
Little is known about the initial public meeting of the African Association except for brief mentions of its establishment in newspapers and the reports of the other groups. The meeting was organized sometime between September and November 1897 at Exeter Hall, London. The treasurer of the African Association was Alice Kinloch.

Members were mainly from the Caribbean and West Africa, and included religious leaders, political activists, teachers, and writers. Several women were also members, though they were titled as honorary members.

=== Political agenda ===
The association's second public meeting was held on 11 January 1898, again at Exeter Hall. After this meeting, the association quickly began work on their political agenda. In March 1898, Williams and Reverend Mason Joseph sought to interview the then Secretary of State for the Colonies, Joseph Chamberlain at the Colonial Office on two separate occasions. Both requests were rejected. A Memorial, written after the first rejection, suggested changes for the sugar industry in British West Indies, advocating for small businesses to "'reap a greater profit and for the greater exploitation of the ‘geographical resources of the West India Colonies.'" It also demanded strong measures against monopolies, supported better education, and measures to finance new farmers. Moreover, it aimed to lessen the cost of transferring land which Williams and Joseph argued was preventing people from acquiring Crown land. Minutes from the Parliament indicates this Memorial had been circulated among several members of parliament, as some had questioned Chamberlain on these issues. Nevertheless, no action was taken.

The Association held its annual general meeting on 25 October 1898. There, the Association published its first annual report and adopted two resolutions. One called for the British government to “meet the needs of the depressed condition of the islands,” and protect “the rights of Native African races brought under British rule and to protect their interests from the caprices of the Chartered Companies.” The other urged the establishment of Association branches in different colonies of the British Empire.

On another occasion, the Association took up the issue of the displaying of Africans as part of shows. Notably, another petition also reached Wilhem II, the German Emperor, concerning similar issues and widening the Association's advocacy beyond Great Britain.

By early 1900, the association changed its office space from Gray's Inn to 139 Palace Chambers, 9 Bridge Street, London SW, and adopted the new name The Pan African Conference Committee (PAC).

=== Publicity ===
During 1898, Williams traveled extensively lecturing, establishing contacts, and increasing support. He met with members of the Aborigines Protection Society (APS), the Anti-Slavery Society, the South Place Ethical Society, the Liberal Party, Society of Friends and the Unitarians. The list of the honorary members expanded to include another MP, more religious leaders, and women. The Association established its first American contact, D. Augustus Straker.

In addition to organizations and societies, Williams and the association maintained contact with several black leaders, including Booker T. Washington. Together they attended one of the annual general meetings of the APS, where they challenged Albert Grey, a member of the board of the British South Africa Company, about the conditions of native African population. With the help of Washington's articles in various newspapers, the African Association became better known.

== First Pan-African Conference ==
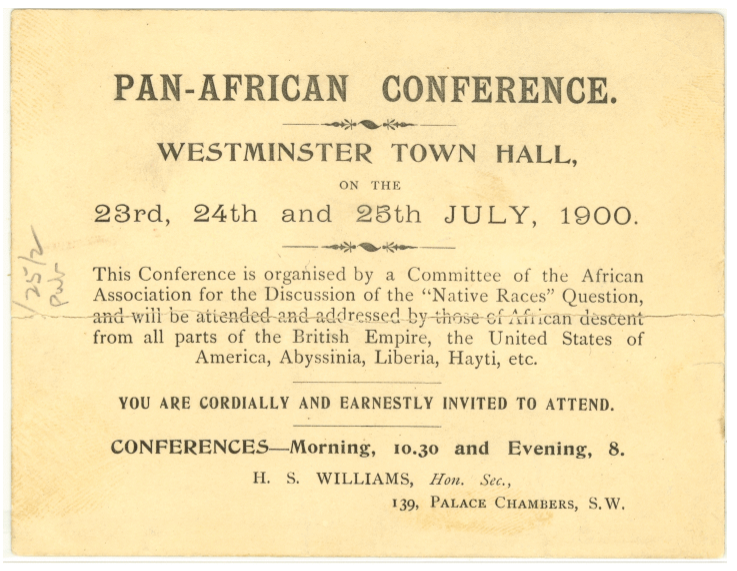
Invitation to the First Pan-African Conference, held 23–25 July 1900

Much of the Association's work and Williams’ travels were dedicated to publicizing and organizing the First Pan-African Conference, which took place in London in July 1900. In articles advertising the Conference, supporters of the African Association totalled 87 in England, 37 in Scotland, and 28 in Dublin. The Pan-African Conference marked the beginnings of the "Pan-African" global political movement that would emerge.

The First Pan-African Conference faced financial difficulties but managed to get by with support from a few wealthy members. Williams expected Washington, or at least his representative, to attend the conference. However, Washington could not attend, about which Williams, in his correspondence, expressed regret; Washington nevertheless continued to help Williams publicize the Conference. While in London, he attended several preparatory meetings and helped craft the programme for the Conference, which covered "existing conditions, slavery, progress, African history, demands for 'Europe's atonement for wrongs' and the 'organised plunder' of Europeans".

=== The Pan-African Association ===
On the last day of conference, 25 July 1900, the African Association changed its name to Pan-African Association (PAA). It also changed its objective:

[Securing] civil and political rights for Africans and their descendants throughout the world; to encourage friendly relations between the Caucasian and African races; to encourage African people everywhere in educational, industrial and commercial enterprise; to approach Governments and influence legislation in the interests of the black races; and to amelio rate the condition of the oppressed negro in all parts of the world.

The permanent office changed to Room 416, 61–2 Chancery Lane, in central London. Additionally, the Association created a bureau to collect information, data, and statistics on the conditions of Africans around the world. Branches in Africa, the West Indies, and the United States were established, and a general meeting was to be organized every two years, first in the U.S., then Haiti.

Other resolutions were passed in addition to the name change. One emphasizes an integral part of the Anti-Slavery Society's works with the PAA’s vision. Another delivered the Association's "sincerest gratitude [for works] by the Native Races and Liquor Traffic United Committee" in prohibiting the traffic of liquors among native Africans. A memorial was sent to Queen Victoria, requesting “more civilised” measures against the social conditions for the natives in South Africa.

A sub-committee headed by W. E. B. Du Bois drafted the "Address to the Nations of the World", which called on European leaders to struggle against racism and disenfranchisement and protect the right to self-government for African populations. It criticized conditions experienced by Africans in "the US, the colonies ruled by France and Germany, and the Congo Free State, as well as Abyssinia, [Haiti], and Liberia, and the 'independent tribes of Africa.'" The draft included the famous line:

The problem of the 20th century is the problem of the colour-line — the question as to how far differences of race which show themselves chiefly in the colour of the skin and the texture of the hair are going to be made hereafter the basis of denying to over half the world the right of sharing to their utmost ability the opportunities and privileges of modern civilisation.

=== Reception ===
In general, the Conference was well-received. Bishop Walters received letters from across the world praising the work of the Pan-African Association.

The Association and the conference itself were mentioned in several newspapers. However, West Indian newspapers mostly complained about the overconfidence in the conditions in South Africa, given it was negotiated by “colonists.” These news reports were also critical of the exaggeration of the experiences of black people in North America and claim that there is no need to re-emigrate back to Africa.

Many newspapers report the "Address to the Nations of the World". However, the famous line was intentionally left out as well as parts that called for African self-government.

== After 1900 ==
=== Jamaica ===
In 1901, Williams decided to take the PAA's advocacy efforts directly to the people of the Americas.

He arrived in Jamaica on 1 March 1901, where he stayed with H. R. Cargill, the only member of the Association in Jamaica. In an interview with The Gleaner, Williams explained that the PAA would represent the African subjects’ voice and that the PAA "was in no way antagonistic to the British government. If the Negro were everywhere treated in a liberal, just and enlightened manner, he would become a better, more loyal and more valuable citizen."

Williams travelled extensively around Jamaica, setting up various branches of the PAA on the island, which were attended by many well-known figures. However, there were immediate disagreements, especially between Williams and the then Acting Governor, Sydney Olivier, who claimed that black people in Jamaica were not oppressed:

[The] Negro race in Africa is far back in the race for progress and needs help to bring them up in line with their more fortunate brethren in the West Indies and in America who had been considerably elevated by being brought into close touch with the white races.”

After two months in Jamaica, Williams departed for Trinidad.

=== Trinidad ===
The first meeting of the PAA in Trinidad was organized on 31 May 1901 and was reportedly attended by "a thousand persons". It was chaired by Edgar Maresse-Smith, an avid supporter of Williams, and Williams was introduced by the local lawyer Emmanuel Lazare. In this meeting, Williams announced the Queen's and Chamberlain's promises, demanded further provisions from the states on behalf of the PAA, and advocated for the rights and privileges for Trinidadians as full British subjects. The meeting also criticized the ongoing racial and class inequalities and called for Trinidadians to be more outspoken.

On 28 June 1901, the PAA's Trinidad branch was officially launched. In mid-July, Williams departed for the United States, where, despite a large African-American population, he and the PAA were not able to harness as much enthusiasm as in the West Indies.

== Dissolution ==
According to The Pan-African, the Association's journal, the PAA ceased operations due to budgetary issues. However, recent scholarship suggests that the reasons for the Association's dissolution were beget by internal grievances and opposition between executives. As Gwilym Colenso and Christopher Saunders explain, Frank Colenso, in his correspondence with Walters, criticized Williams for his "improper use of the title and method of organisation of the late association." Colenso disapproved of Williams “[taking] policy decisions or making constitutional changes without reference to other committee members or to officers.”

Furthermore, while bearing the title of "Pan-African", the PAA advocated solely for conditions of the native African populations in British colonies and protectorate. In particular, Frank Colenso saw Williams’ work as being "within a framework which was Anglo-African rather than Afro-American", thus "denying" Pan-Africanism. These disagreements between the American and British members within the PAA were another trigger of the PAA's disbandment.

With Williams away in the Americas, Colenso was able to act more independently, eventually usurping power from Williams. However, his decision to dissolve the PAA was not a unilateral as there were other members and executives, who Colenso referred to as "my colleagues", that did raise objections.

== People ==
Board of the Pan-African Association (1900–1901)
| Title | Name | Notes |
|---|---|---|
| President | Bishop Alexander Walters | Walters was born into slavery in Kentucky in 1858.; He served as president of the National Afro-American Council, and was a member of the National Association for the Advancement of Colored People. |
| Vice President | Reverend Henry B. Brown | |
| General Secretary | Henry Sylvester Williams | |
| Treasurer | Frank Colenso | Frank Colenso's brother, Robert Colenso, is demarcated as the Treasurer, but scholars suggest Frank Colenso was actually the treasurer. (S. O. 150); Frank Colenso born in South Africa to John Colenso and Sarah Frances Bunyon. He was educated as a barrister at University of Cambridge and became involved in the African Association in part because of his activism for Zulus and other natives of South Africa. (Gwilym Colenso) |
| General Delegate for Africa | Benito Sylvain | Sylvain was a Haitian journalist, diplomat, and lawyer. |

Executive Committee members:

- John Richard Archer
- Anna Julia Haywood Cooper
- Samuel Coleridge-Taylor
- Henry F. Downing
- Frederick J. Loudin
- Mrs. Jane Cobden Unwin

== Legacy ==
The Pan-African Association introduced Pan-Africanism as an ideology distinct from the abolitionist movement in the British Empire. The conferences and meetings organized by the Association helped to create transnational links between activists of African descent.

Despite the PAA's dissolution, its branch in Jamaica continued to advocate for the same objectives, though under a different name, until at least 1903.

In Trinidad, the PAA's branch maintained enough momentum that local newspapers continued to report its meetings. The branch continued to petition the British government in the hopes that King Edward would extend the political rights of colonial subjects. At various fundraising concerts, the branch attempted to gain further support from other British Caribbean colonies as well. Despite close connections between Williams and the Association's representative, Lazare, there was not enough enthusiasm for the PAA to continue operation. It died out in late 1901, when many original supporters moved on to create a new association with more local visions.

“Pan-Africanism” replaced Du Bois's "Pan-Negroism" and signified a more universal type of advocacy for the rights of native African population in the colonies and African descendants elsewhere. In addition, the model that the Association proposed, with congresses and meetings organized annually, paved the way for the formation of the Pan-African Congress.

== See also ==
- Pan-Africanism
- Pan-African Congress

== Bibliography ==
- Adi, Hakim (2018). Pan-Africanism: A History. London; New York: Bloomsbury Academic. ISBN 978-1-4742-5427-4.
- Carey, Jane; Lydon, Jane (27 June 2014). Indigenous Networks: Mobility, Connections and Exchange. Routledge. ISBN 978-1-315-76606-5.
- Colenso, Gwilym (24 May 2008). "Colenso, Francis Ernest [Frank]". Oxford Dictionary of National Biography (online ed.). Oxford University Press. doi:10.1093/ref:odnb/95487. (Subscription, Wikipedia Library access or UK public library membership required.)
- Colenso, Gwilym (8 August 2014). "The 1907 Deputation of Basuto Chiefs to London and the Development of British–South African Networks". The International History Review. 36 (4): 619–652. doi:10.1080/07075332.2013.836123.
- Colenso, Gwilym; Saunders, Christopher (2008). "New Light on the Pan-African Association: Part II". African Research & Documentation. 108 (108): 89–109. doi:10.1017/S0305862X00023360. ISSN 0305-862X.
- Esedebe, Peter Olisanwuche (1982). Pan-Africanism: The Idea and Movement, 1776-1963. Howard University Press. ISBN 978-0-88258-125-5.
- Geiss, Imanuel (1974). The Pan African Movement: A History Of Pan Africanism In America, Europe, And Africa. New York: Africana Pub. Co. ISBN 978-0-8419-0161-2.
- Langley, J. Ayodele (1979). Ideologies of Liberation in Black Africa, 1856 – 1970: Documents on Modern African Political Thought from Colonial Times to the Present. London: R. Collings. ISBN 978-0-86036-039-1.
- Mathurin, Owen Charles (1976). Henry Sylvester Williams and the Origins of the Pan-African Movement, 1869 – 1911. Contributions in Afro-American and African studies. Westport, Conn: Greenwood Press. ISBN 978-0-8371-8594-1.
- Moses, Wilson Jeremiah (5 May 1988). The Golden Age of Black Nationalism, 1850-1925 (Reprint ed.). New York: Oxford University Press. ISBN 978-0-19-520639-5.
- Muchie, Mammo; Lukhele-Olorunju, Phindil; Akpor, Oghenerobor B. (2013). The African Union Ten Years After: Solving African Problems with Pan-Africanism and the African Renaissance. African Books Collective. ISBN 978-0-7983-0405-4.
- Schneer, Jonathan. (2003). "Anti-imperial London: the Pan-African Conference of 1900.". In Gretchen Holbrook Gerzina (ed.). Black Victorians/Black Victoriana. New Jersey: Rutgers University Press. pp. 175–186.
- Sherwood, Marika (2011). Origins of Pan-Africanism: Henry Sylvester Williams, Africa, and the African Diaspora. Routledge. ISBN 978-0-415-87959-0.
- Sivagurunathan, Shivani (2007). "Pan-Africanism". The Oxford Companion to Black British History. Oxford University Press. ISBN 978-0-19-280439-6.
- Walters, Ronald W. (1993). Pan-Africanism in the African Diaspora: An Analysis of Modern Afrocentric Political Movements. African American life series. Detroit: Wayne State. ISBN 978-0-8143-2184-3.
