= Westminster =

City in Central London, England

Coordinates: 51°29′41″N 00°08′07″W

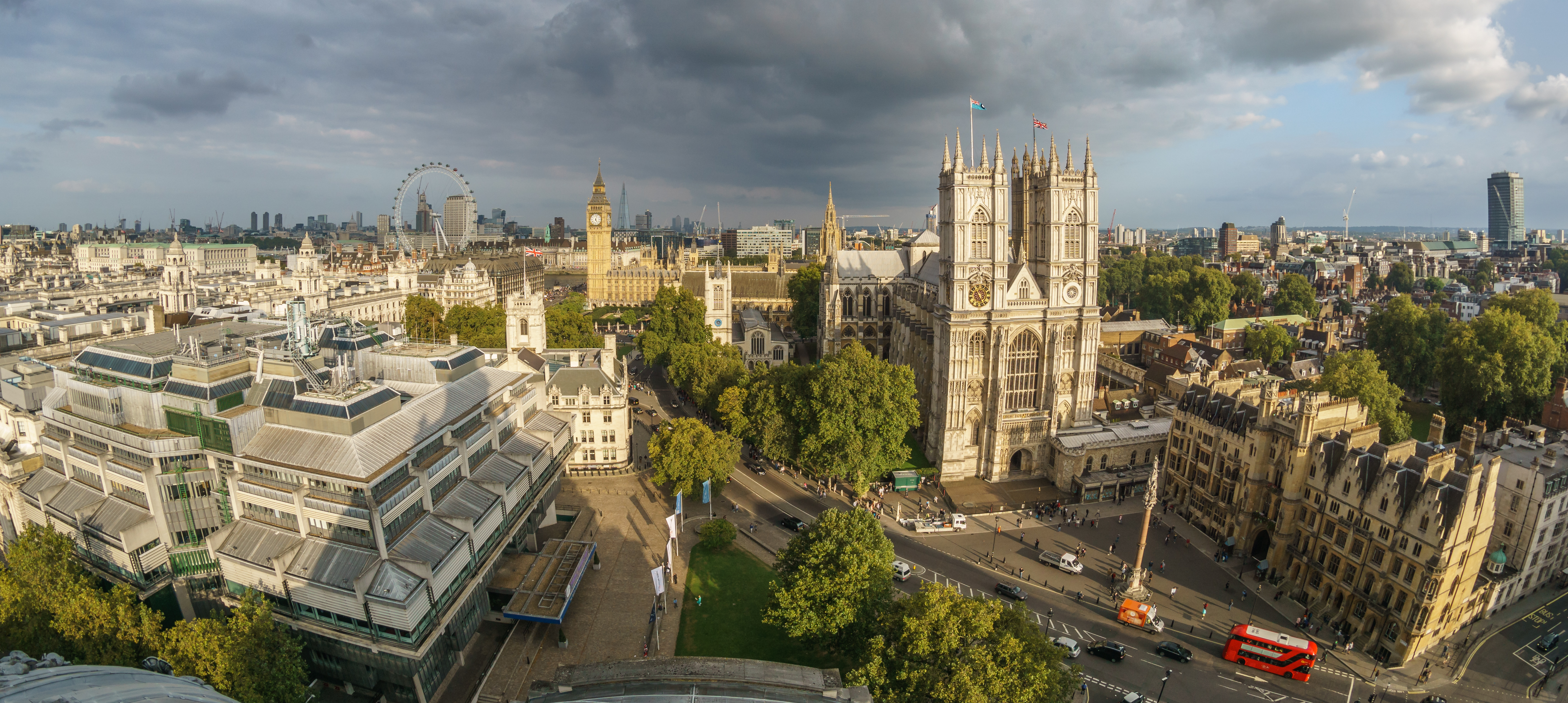
- Westminster from Methodist Central Hall, with Westminster Abbey at right

- Location within Greater London
- OS grid reference: TQ295795
  - Charing Cross: 0.58 mi (0.9 km) NEbE
- London borough: Westminster
- Ceremonial county: Greater London
- Region: London
- Country: England
- Sovereign state: United Kingdom
- Post town: LONDON
- Postcode district: SW1
- Dialling code: 020
- Police: Metropolitan
- Fire: London
- Ambulance: London
- UK Parliament: Cities of London and Westminster
- London Assembly: West Central

Westminster (/ˈwɛstˌmɪnstər/) is the main settlement of the City of Westminster in Central London, England. It extends from the River Thames to Oxford Street and has many famous landmarks, including the Palace of Westminster, Buckingham Palace, Westminster Abbey, Westminster Cathedral, Trafalgar Square and much of the West End cultural centre including the entertainment area of West End theatre.

The name (Old English: Westmynstre) originated from the informal description of the abbey church and royal peculiar of St Peter's (Westminster Abbey), west of the City of London (until the English Reformation there was also an Eastminster abbey, on the other side of the City of London, in the East End of London). The abbey's origins date from between the 7th and 10th centuries, but it rose to national prominence when rebuilt by Edward the Confessor in the 11th century. With the development of the old palace alongside the abbey, Westminster has been the home of England's government since about 1200, and from 1707 the Government of the United Kingdom. In 1539, it became a city.

Westminster is often used as a metonym to refer to the Parliament of the United Kingdom, which sits in the Palace of Westminster.

== Geography ==
=== Physical geography ===
The City and Liberty of Westminster and other historical Westminster administrative units (except the broader modern City of Westminster, a London Borough created in 1965) extended from the River Thames to the old Roman road from the City to western England, which is now locally called Oxford Street.

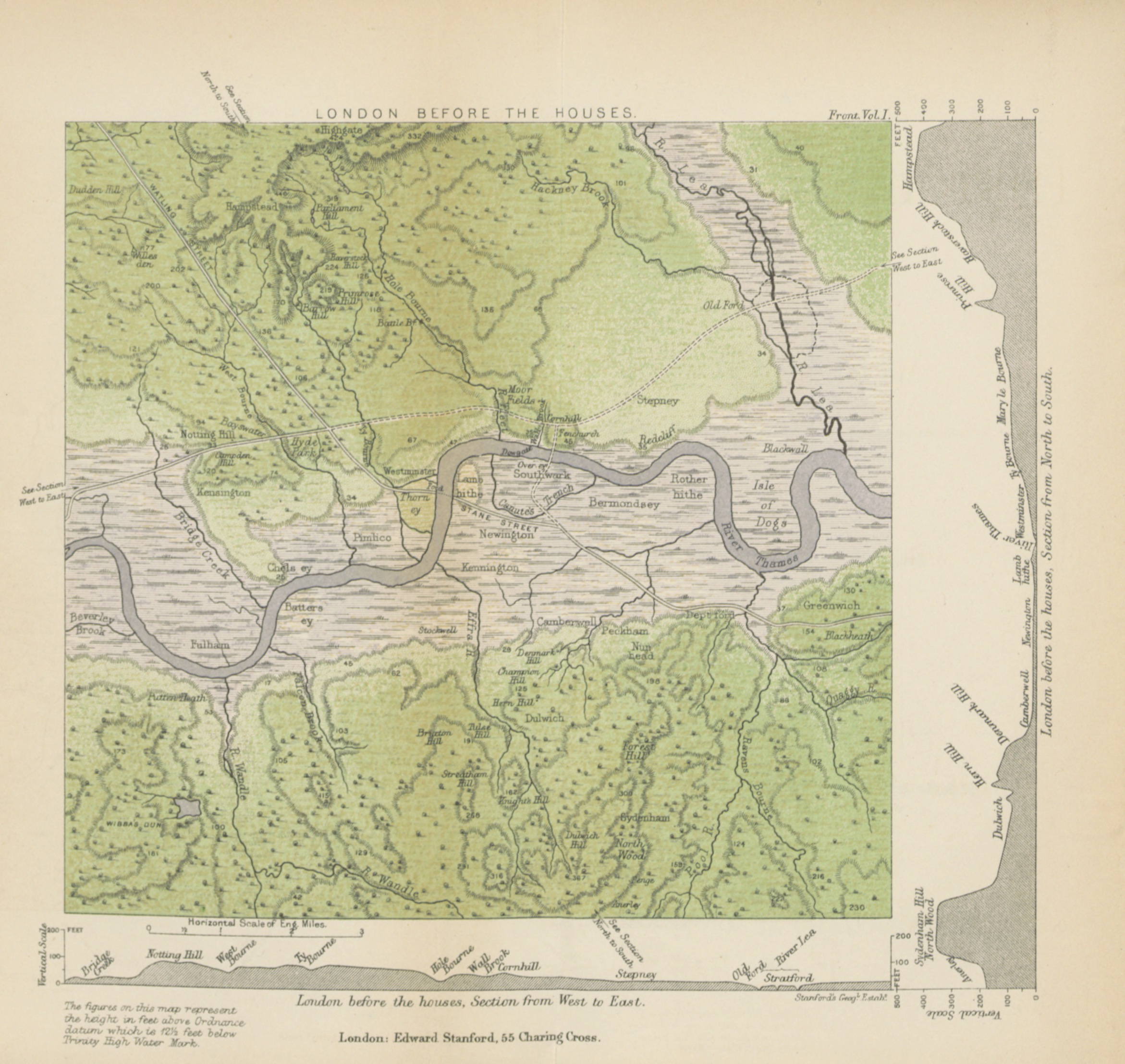

Westminster before urbanisation. The Roman road (modern Oxford Street) is shown at top running west.

Thorney Island lay between the arms of the former River Tyburn at its confluence with the Thames, while the western boundary with Chelsea was formed by the similarly lost River Westbourne. The line of the river still forms (with very slight revisions) the boundaries of the modern borough with the Royal Borough of Kensington and Chelsea.

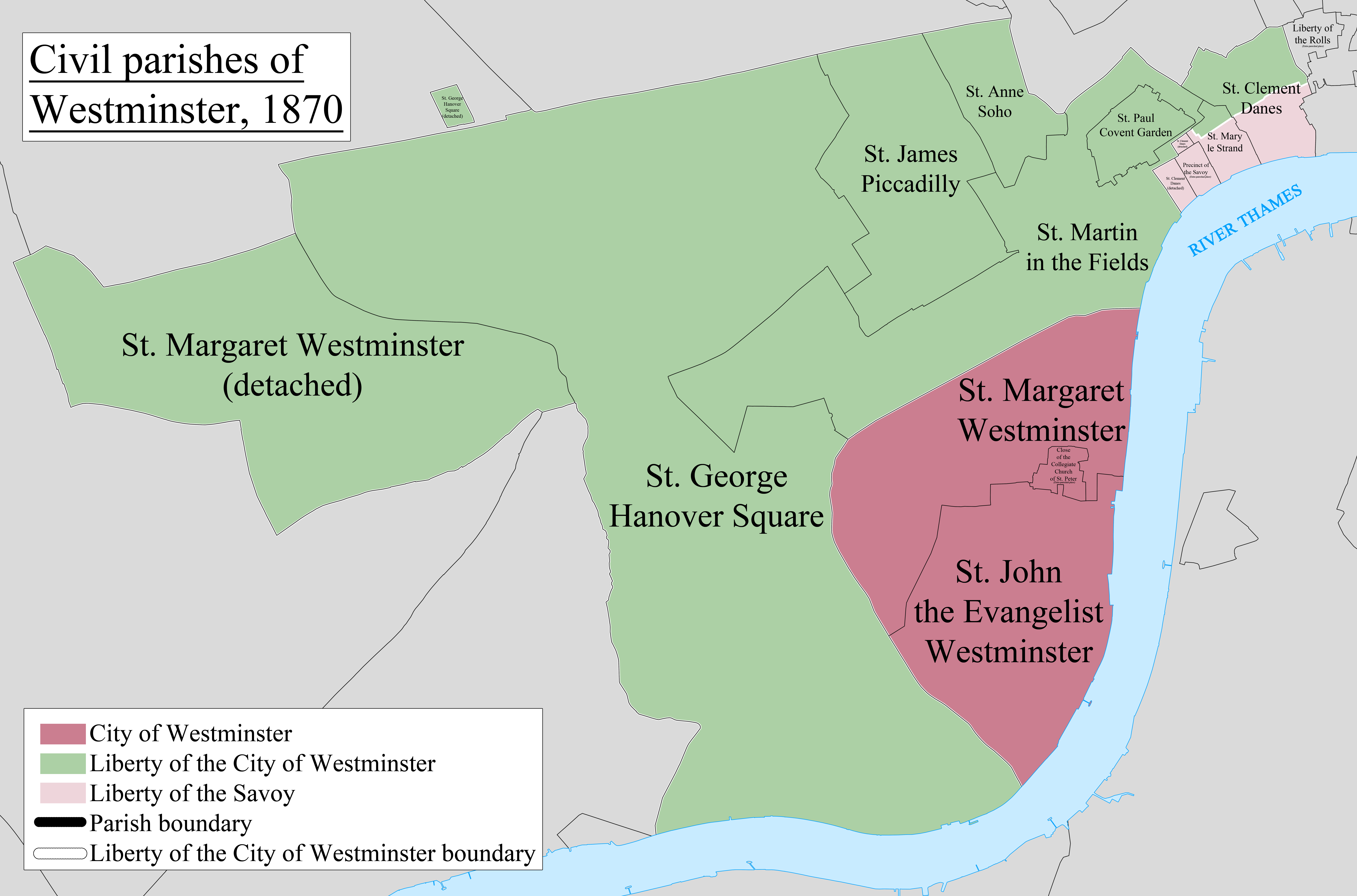
Parishes and Places of the City and Liberty of Westminster. The lower Westbourne formed part of the western boundary, and Oxford Street the north.

Further north, away from the river mouth, Westminster included land on both sides of the Westbourne, notably Knightsbridge (including the parts of Hyde Park west of the Serpentine lake (originally formed by damming the river) and most of Kensington Gardens).

=== Localities ===
Westminster includes the sub-districts of Soho, St James, Mayfair, Covent Garden (shared with neighbouring Camden), Pimlico, Victoria, Belgravia and Knightsbridge (shared with neighbouring Kensington).

The former City of Westminster merged with the neighbouring boroughs of Paddington and Marylebone in 1965 to form a larger modern borough. These neighbouring areas (except for a small area of Paddington in part of Kensington Gardens), lie north of Oxford Street and its westward continuation, Bayswater Road.

=== Open spaces ===
The district's open spaces include:

- Hyde Park
- Kensington Gardens (part)
- Green Park
- Buckingham Palace Garden
- St James's Park

== Origins and administration ==
The development of the area began with the establishment of Westminster Abbey on a site then called Thorney Island. The site may have been chosen because of the natural ford which is thought to have carried Watling Street over the Thames in the vicinity. The wider district became known as Westminster in reference to the church.

=== Legendary origin ===
The legendary origin is that in the early 7th century, a local fisherman named Edric (or Aldrich) ferried a stranger in tattered foreign clothing over the Thames to Thorney Island. It was a miraculous appearance of St Peter, a fisherman himself, coming to the island to consecrate the newly built church, which later developed into Westminster Abbey. He rewarded Edric with a bountiful catch when he next dropped his nets. Edric was instructed to present the king and St. Mellitus, Bishop of London, with a salmon and various proofs that the consecration had already occurred. Every year on 29 June, St Peter's Day, the Worshipful Company of Fishmongers presents the Abbey with a salmon in memory of this event.

=== Recorded origin ===
A charter of 785, possibly a forgery, grants land to the needy people of God in Thorney, in the dreadful spot which is called Westminster. The text suggests a pre-existing monastic community who chose to live in a very challenging location.

The recorded origins of the Abbey (rather than a less important religious site) date to the 960s or early 970s, when Saint Dunstan and King Edgar installed a community of Benedictine monks on the site.

Between 1042 and 1052, King Edward the Confessor began rebuilding St Peter's Abbey to provide himself with a royal burial church. It was the first church in England built in the Romanesque style. The building was completed around 1060 and was consecrated on 28 December 1065, only a week before Edward's death on 5 January 1066. A week later, he was buried in the church; and, nine years later, his wife Edith was buried alongside him. His successor, Harold II, was probably crowned in the abbey, although the first documented coronation is that of William the Conqueror later the same year.

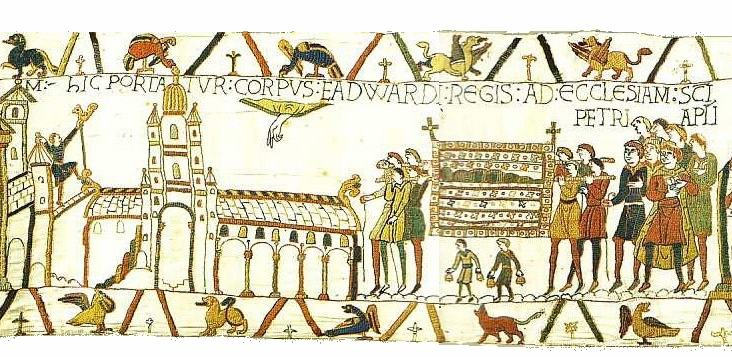
St Peter's Abbey at the time of King Edward the Confessor's funeral, depicted in the Bayeux Tapestry

The only extant depiction of Edward's abbey, together with the adjacent Palace of Westminster, is in the Bayeux Tapestry. Some of the lower parts of the monastic dormitory, an extension of the south transept, survive in the Norman Undercroft of the Great School, including a door said to come from the previous Saxon abbey. Increased endowments supported a community that increased from a dozen monks in Dunstan's original foundation, up to a maximum of about eighty monks.

=== Local government ===
The Metropolitan Borough of Westminster was almost co-terminous with the older City and Liberty of Westminster, with ancient Oxford Street as the northern boundary.

==== Parish of Westminster St Margaret ====
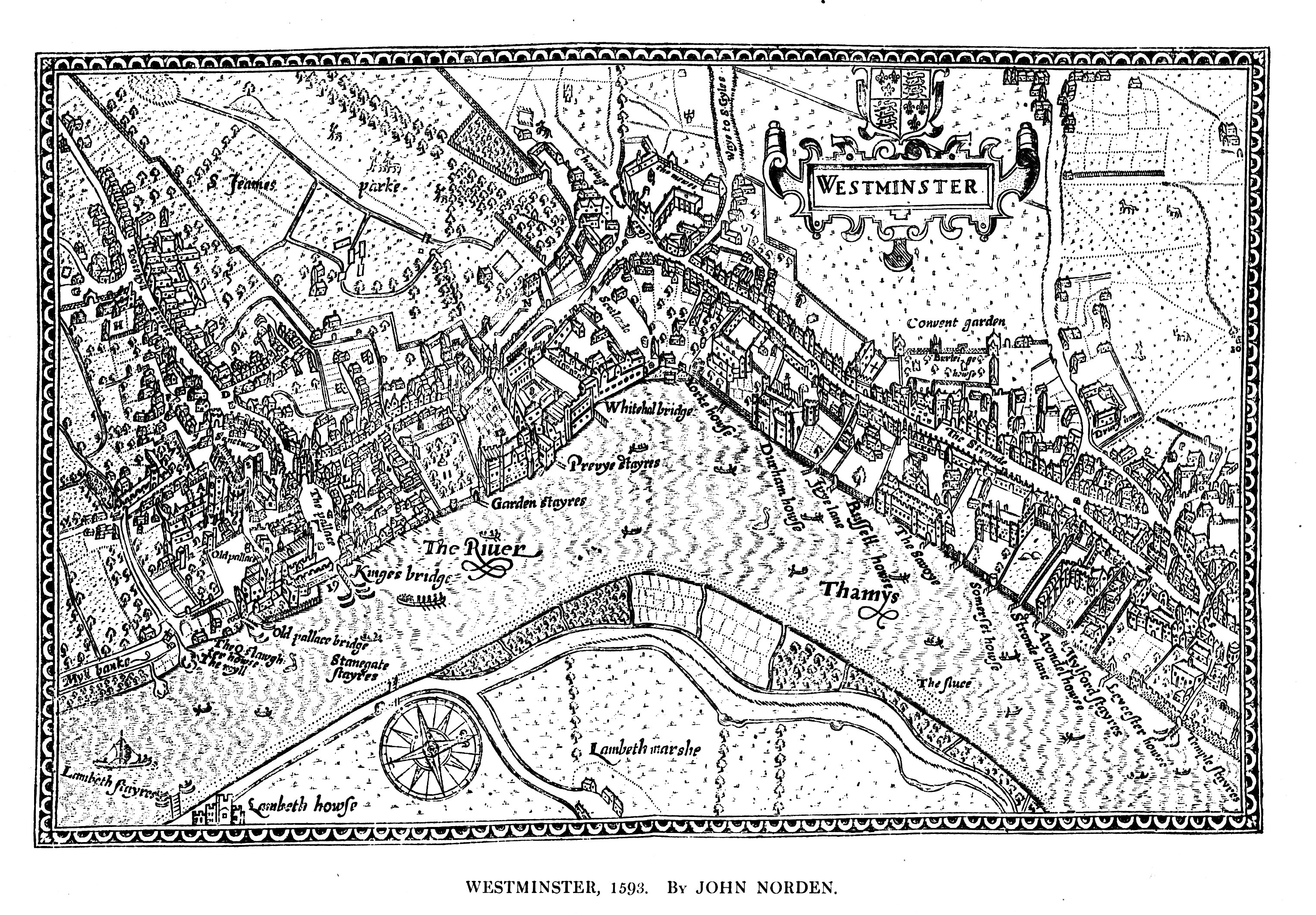
John Norden's map of Westminster (1593)

Most of the parishes of Westminster originated as daughter parishes of St Margaret's parish, in the City and Liberty of Westminster, Middlesex. The exceptions to this were St Clement Danes, St Mary le Strand and possibly some other small areas.

The ancient parish was St Margaret; after 1727 this became the civil parish of 'St Margaret and St John', the latter a new church required for the increasing population. The area around Westminster Abbey formed the extra-parochial Close of the Collegiate Church of St Peter. Like many large parishes, Westminster was divided into smaller units called Hamlets (meaning a territorial sub-division, rather than a small village). These would later become independent daughter parishes.

Until 1900 the local authority was the combined vestry of St Margaret and St John (also known as the Westminster District Board of Works from 1855 to 1887), which was based at Westminster Town Hall in Caxton Street from 1883.

==== City and Liberty of Westminster ====
The City and Liberty of Westminster, governed by the Westminster Court of Burgesses, also included St Martin in the Fields and several other parishes and places. Westminster had its own quarter sessions, but the Middlesex sessions also had jurisdiction.

==== Metropolitan Borough of Westminster ====
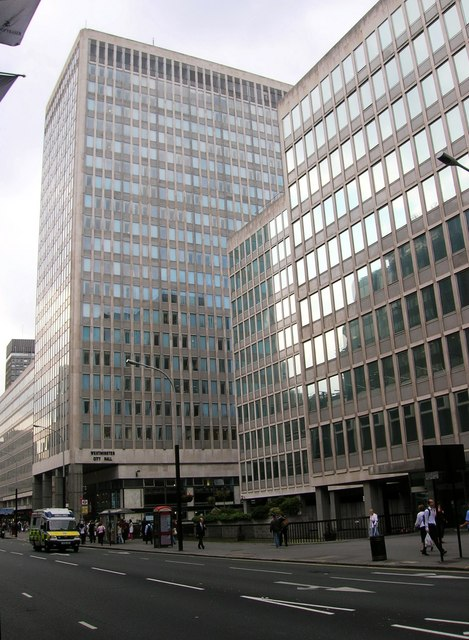
Westminster City Hall, completed in 1965

Under local government reforms in 1889, the area fell within the newly created County of London, and the local government of Westminster was further reformed in 1900, when the court of burgesses and the parish vestries were abolished and replaced by the Metropolitan Borough of Westminster. The borough was given city status at the same time, allowing it to be known as the City of Westminster and its council as Westminster City Council.

The City and Liberty of Westminster and the Metropolitan Borough of Westminster were very similar in extent, covering the parts of the wider modern City of Westminster south of the Oxford Street, and its continuations Hyde Park Place. The exception is that part of Kensington Gardens, south of that road, are part of Paddington.

Westminster merged with St Marylebone and Paddington in 1965, but the combined area was allowed to keep the title City of Westminster.

== History ==
=== Royal seat ===
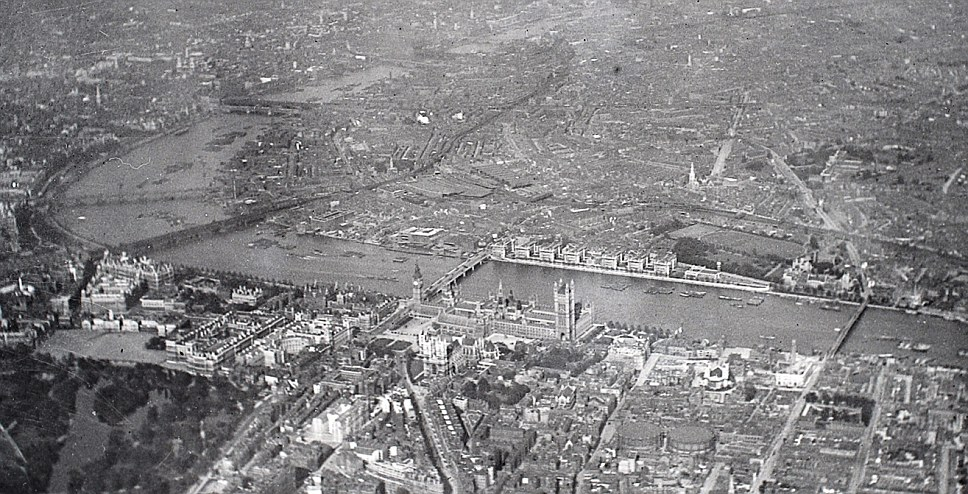
Bird's-eye view of Westminster and the River Thames in 1909

The former Thorney Island, the site of Westminster Abbey, formed the historic core of Westminster. The abbey became the traditional venue of the coronations of the kings and queens of England from that of Harold Godwinson (1066) onwards.

From about 1200 the Palace of Westminster, near the abbey, became the principal royal residence, a transition marked by the transfer of royal treasury and financial records to Westminster from Winchester. Later the palace housed the developing Parliament and England's law courts. Thus, London developed two focal points: the City of London (financial/economic) and Westminster (political and cultural).

The monarchs moved their principal residence to the Palace of Whitehall (1530–1698), then to St James's Palace in 1698, and eventually to Buckingham Palace and other palaces after 1762. The main law courts moved to the Royal Courts of Justice in the late-19th century.

=== Medieval and Tudor ===
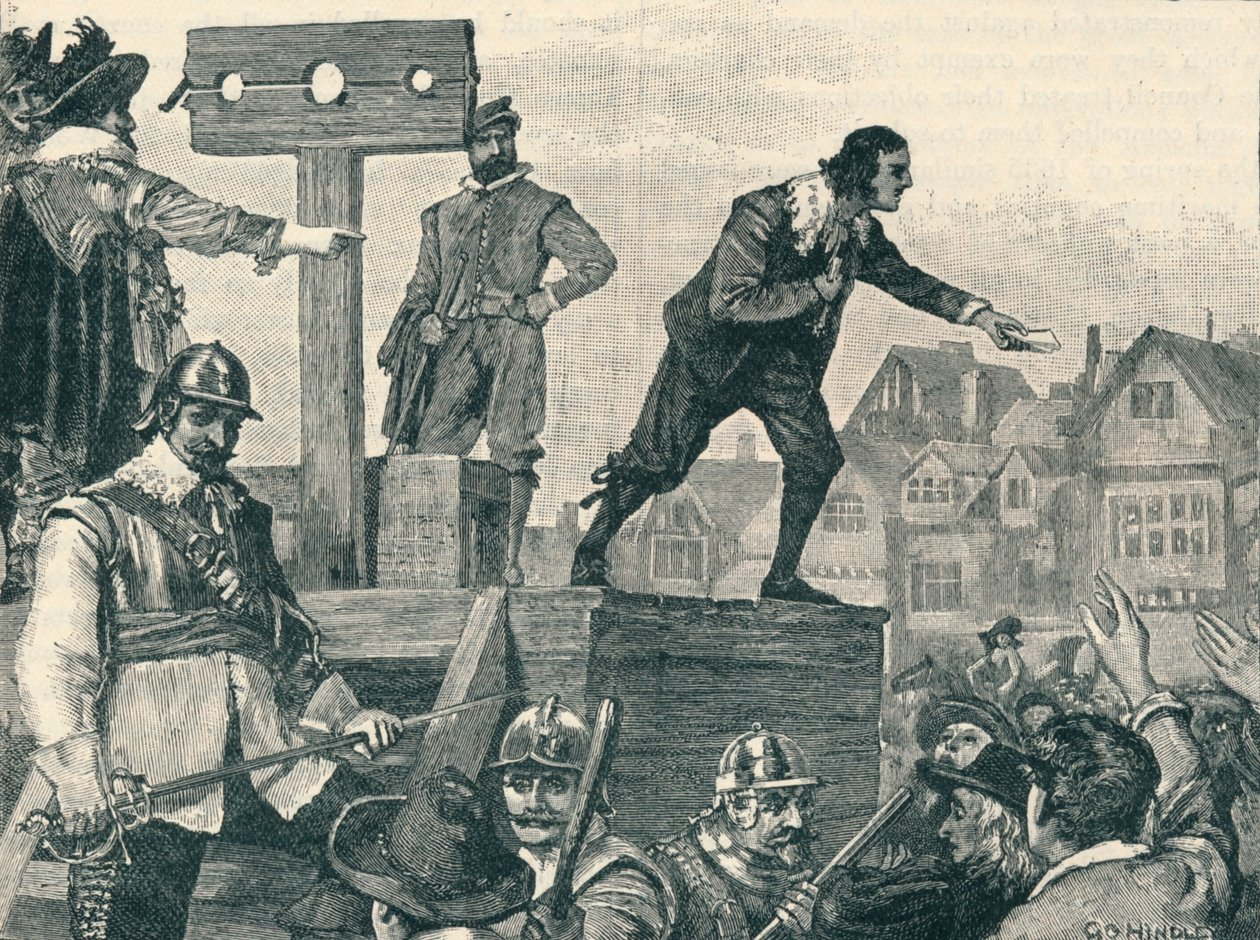
John Lilburne on the pillory at Westminster in 1638

The settlement grew up around the palace and abbey, as a service area for them. The parish church, St Margaret's Westminster served the wider community of the parish; the servants of the palace and abbey as well as the rural population and those associated with the high status homes developing on the road from the city. The area became larger and in the Georgian period became connected through urban ribbon development with the City along the Strand.

Henry VIII's Reformation in the early 16th century abolished the abbey and established a cathedral – thus the parish ranked as a "City", although it was only a fraction of the size of the City of London and the Borough of Southwark at that time.

Indeed, the cathedral and diocesan status of the church lasted only from 1539 to 1556, but the "city" status remained for a mere parish within Middlesex. As such it is first known to have had two Members of Parliament in 1545 as a new Parliamentary Borough, centuries after the City of London and Southwark were enfranchised.

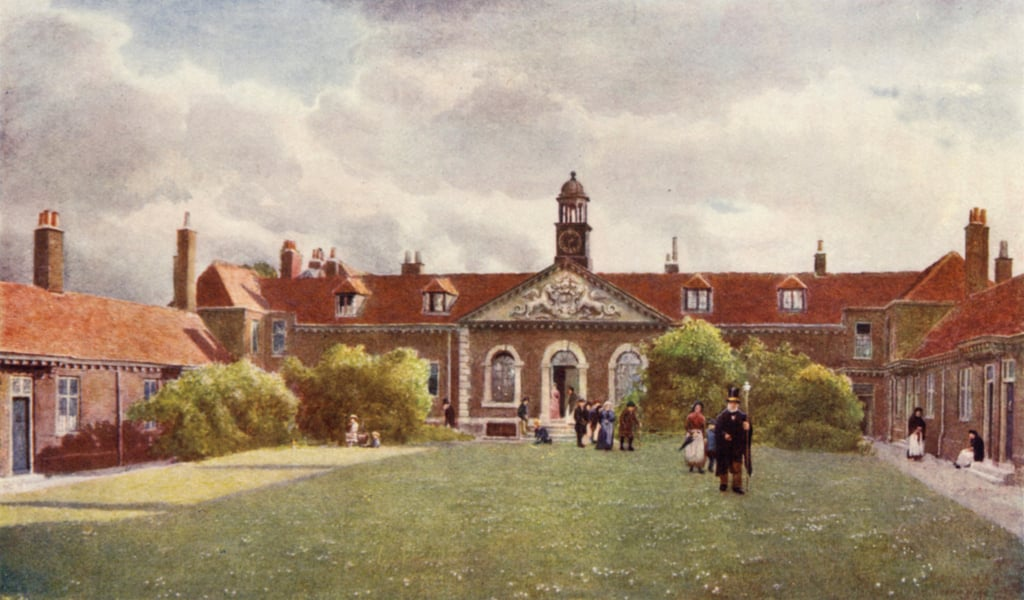
Emanuel Hospital, Westminster, 1890 by Philip Norman

The growing Elizabethan city had a High Constable, Bailiff, Town Clerk, and a keeper of the ponds.

=== Victorian divide ===
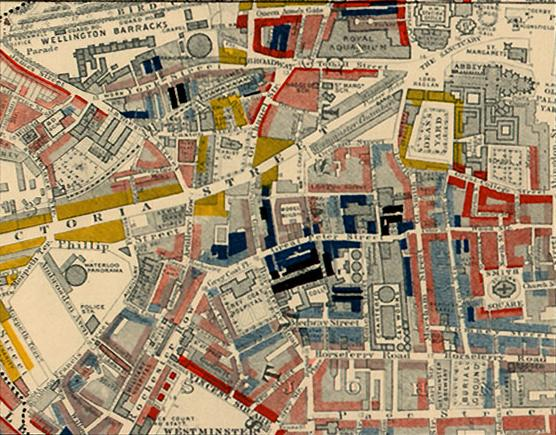
Part of Charles Booth's poverty map showing Westminster in 1889. The colours of the streets represent the economic class of the residents: Yellow ("Upper-middle and Upper classes, Wealthy"), red ("Lower middle class – Well-to-do middle class"), pink ("Fairly comfortable good ordinary earnings"), blue ("Intermittent or casual earnings"), and black ("lowest class occasional labourers, street sellers, loafers, criminals and semi-criminals"). Booth coloured Victoria Street, with its new shops and flats, yellow. The model dwellings built by the Peabody Trust on the side streets off Victoria Street appear as pink and grey, signalling modest respectability, while the black and blue streets represent the remaining slum areas housing the poorest.

Charles Booth's poverty map showing Westminster in 1889 recorded the full range of income- and capital-brackets living in adjacent streets within the area; its central western area had become (by 1850) (the) Devil's Acre in the southern flood-channel ravine of the River Tyburn, yet Victoria Street and other small streets and squares had the highest colouring of social class in London: yellow/gold. Westminster has shed the abject poverty with the clearance of this slum and with drainage improvement, but there is a typical Central London property distinction within the area which is very acute, epitomised by grandiose 21st-century developments, architectural high-point listed buildings and nearby social housing (mostly non-council housing) buildings of the Peabody Trust founded by philanthropist George Peabody.

== Wider uses of the name ==
Given the focus on Westminster in English and British public life over centuries, the name "Westminster" is casually used as a metonym for the UK Parliament and for the political community of the United Kingdom generally. (The civil service is similarly referred to using the name of the northern sub-neighbourhood which it inhabits, "Whitehall".) "Westminster" is consequently also used in reference to the Westminster system, the parliamentary model of democratic government that has evolved in the United Kingdom and for those other nations, particularly in the Commonwealth of Nations and for other parts of the former British Empire that adopted it.

The term "Westminster Village", sometimes used in the context of British politics, does not refer to a geographical area at all; employed especially in the phrase "Westminster Village gossip", it denotes a supposedly close social circle of members of parliament, political journalists, so-called spin-doctors and others connected to events in the Palace of Westminster and in Government ministries.

The name "Westminster" is also associated with the Westminster Assembly, a council of theologians and members of the English Parliament that met at Westminster Abbey between 1643 and 1653 during the English Civil War. Convened to reform the Church of England, the assembly produced the Westminster Confession of Faith, the Westminster Larger Catechism, and the Westminster Shorter Catechism, collectively known as the Westminster Standards. These works were adopted by the Church of Scotland and have since become foundational doctrinal standards for many Presbyterian and Reformed churches worldwide. As a result, the name "Westminster" has acquired enduring significance in Christian theology alongside its longstanding political and governmental associations.

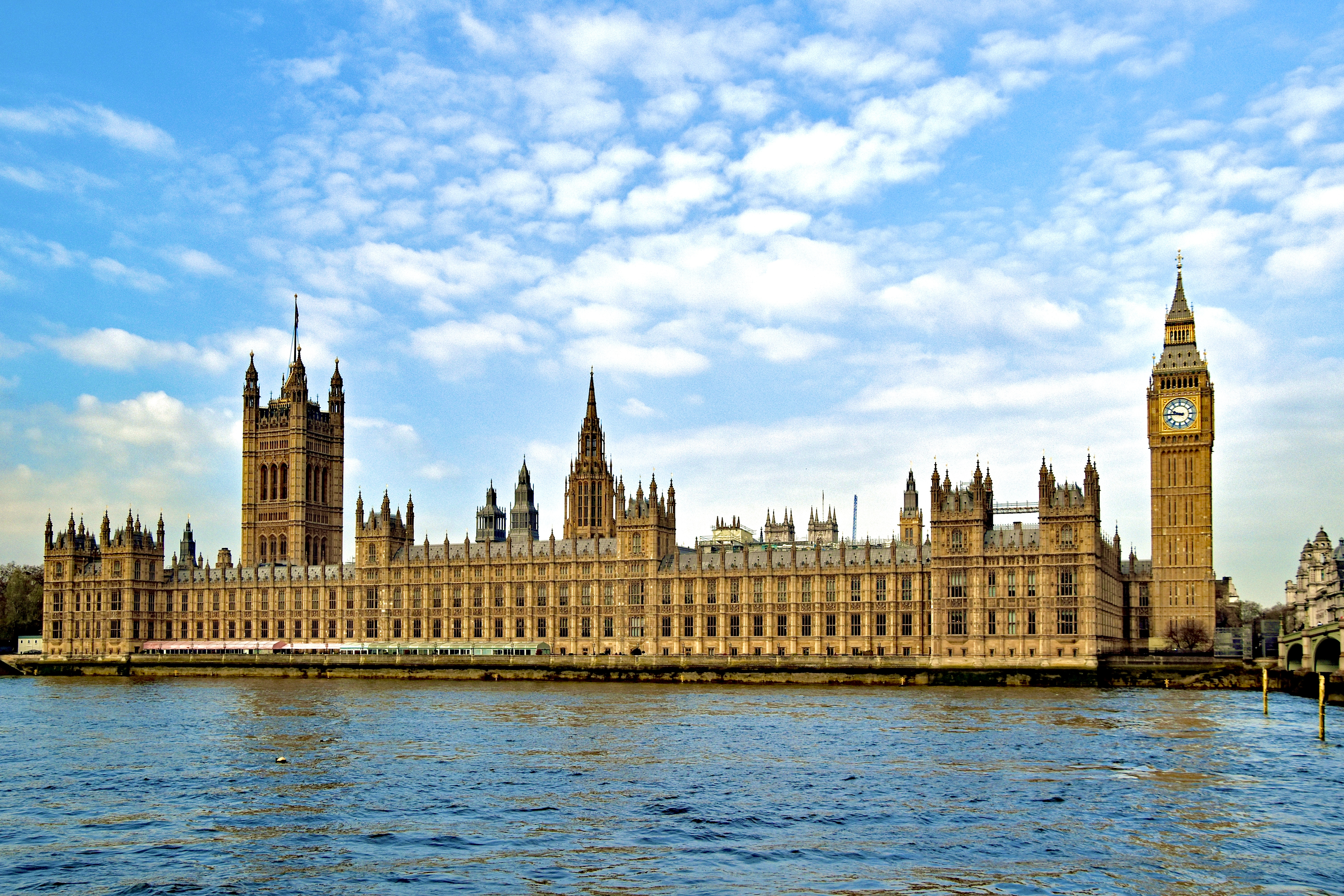
Panorama of the Palace of Westminster

== Economy ==
The area has a substantial residential population. By the 20th century Westminster saw rising numbers of residential apartments with wealthy inhabitants. Hotels, large Victorian homes and barracks exist near to Buckingham Palace. Westminster has a large number of pubs, bars and restaurants. As of October 2024, Westminster has 1,430 licensed restaurants employing 37,183 people, and 565 unlicensed restaurants employing 7,495 people, according to Office for National Statistics data; these are the highest figures among London boroughs.

=== High Commissions ===
Westminster hosts the High Commissions of many Commonwealth countries:

- Australia
- The Bahamas
- Brunei
- Canada
- Cyprus
- Eswatini
- Ghana
- India
- Lesotho
- Malaysia
- New Zealand
- Nigeria
- Pakistan
- Papua New Guinea
- Seychelles
- Singapore
- South Africa
- Trinidad and Tobago
- Uganda

=== Education ===
Within the area is Westminster School, a major public school which grew out of the abbey, and the University of Westminster, attended by over 20,000 students.

== Notable people ==
- Jessica Alexander (born 1999), actress
- Finn Azaz (born 2000), footballer
- Andy Bray (born 1981), cricketer
- Arthur Barnby (1881–1937), first-class cricketer and Royal Marines/Royal Naval Air Service officer
- Richard Colley (1833–1902), first-class cricketer and British Army officer
- Geoffrey Cooke (1897–1980), first-class cricketer and British Army officer
- John Fuller (1834–1893), first-class cricketer, clergyman and theologian
- Ava Gardner (24 December 1922 – 25 January 1990), American actress and singer
- Hady Ghandour (born 2000), footballer
- Tatiana Hambro (born 1989), fashion writer and editor
- Tom Hiddleston (born 1981), Golden Globe-winning actor
- Stephanie Leonidas (born 1982), actress
- Alice Liddell (1852–1934), inspiration for Alice In Wonderland
- Edward Low (1690–1724), pirate during the latter days of the Golden Age of Piracy
- Henry Purcell (1659-1695), composer
- Eddie Redmayne (born 1982), Oscar-winning actor
- Quintin Twiss (1835–1900), first-class cricketer and stage actor
- Mary Woffington (1729–1811), socialite
