= Ella D. Barrier =

American educator and clubwoman (1852–1945)

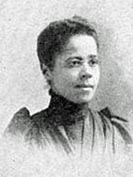
- Born: c. 1852; Brockport, New York
- Died: February 9, 1945 (aged 92–93)
- Education: Brockport Normal and Training School
- Occupation: Educator

Ella D. Barrier (c. 1852 — February 9, 1945) was an American educator and clubwoman. Her younger sister was Fannie Barrier Williams.

== Early life ==
Ella (or Ellen) D. Barrier was born in Brockport, New York, the daughter of Anthony J. Barrier, a barber, and Harriet A. Prince Barrier. Both parents were born in the northern United States. Her younger sister was Fannie Barrier Williams. Ella graduated from the Brockport Normal and Training School in 1871, trained to be a school teacher.

== Career ==
Ella Barrier was hired in 1875 to teach in the segregated schools of Washington, D.C. She stayed in Washington for more than forty years, working as a teacher, school principal, and clubwoman. Barrier helped develop the Washington branch of the YWCA. In 1891, she taught in Toronto, as part of a teacher exchange project. In 1900 she and her sister traveled as African-American representatives at the Paris Exposition, and to the First Pan-African Conference in London, in a delegation that included Anna Julia Cooper and W. E. B. DuBois. She was active in the Colored Women's League in Washington.

== Personal life ==
Ella D. Barrier and her sister lived together in Brockport in their last years. Fannie died in 1944, and Ella died in 1945, aged 92 years.
