= Benito Sylvain =

Haitian journalist

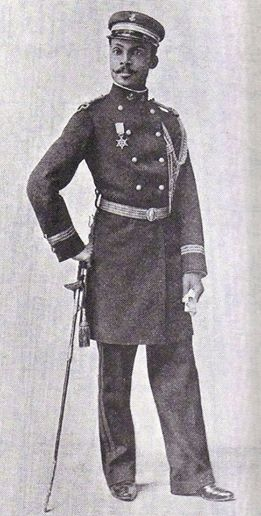

Aide and Adjutant to Menelik II
- In office 1897–1906
- Leader: Menelik II
- Preceded by: Office established
- Succeeded by: Office abolished

Personal details
- Born: Marie-Joseph Benoît d'Artagnan Sylvain; 21 March 1868 Port-de-Paix, Haiti
- Died: 3 January 1915 (aged 46) Port-au-Prince, Haiti

Military service
- Allegiance: Haiti; Ethiopian Empire

Benito Sylvain (born Marie-Joseph Benoît d'Artagnan Sylvain; 21 March 1868 – 3 January 1915) was a Haitian journalist, diplomat, lawyer. He also participated and organized the 1900 Pan-African Conference and was a close friend of W. E. B. Du Bois.

Sylvain pathed the connection between Afro-descendants and Africans and became a representative for these groups that were colonized by France. He is arguably considered to be a pioneer of Pan-Africanism.

== Biography ==
Benito Sylvain was born in Port-de-Paix, Haiti, in 1868. In 1887, he finished his studies in Paris at the Collège Stanislas, then attended law school, where he obtained his license and then his doctorate.

Supported by his country that appoints the officer of Marine and secretary to the embassy in London, Sylvain founded in Paris in 1890 a weekly committed against French colonialism, La Fraternité (which appeared until 1897).

In 1897, Sylvain staying in Ethiopia became the aide-de-camp to Emperor Menelik II, who defeated the Italians at the Battle of Adwa. Sylvain represented both Ethiopia and Haiti at the 1900 Pan-African Conference held in London, and was appointed as honorary president of the Pan African Association.

In 1906, Sylvain, who attended all lectures against slavery, published in Paris his principal work, entitled On the fate of the natives in the colonies of exploitation, an indictment against colonialism.

As there were very active Afro-descended students in France, including his compatriot Haitians, Sylvain endeavoured to make the connection between Afro-descendants and Africans, in a spirit of resistance to European colonialism, which he reasoned was a new form of slavery.
