= Close of the Collegiate Church of St Peter =

Extra-parochial area/civil parish in England

Coordinates: 51.4995°N 0.1280°W

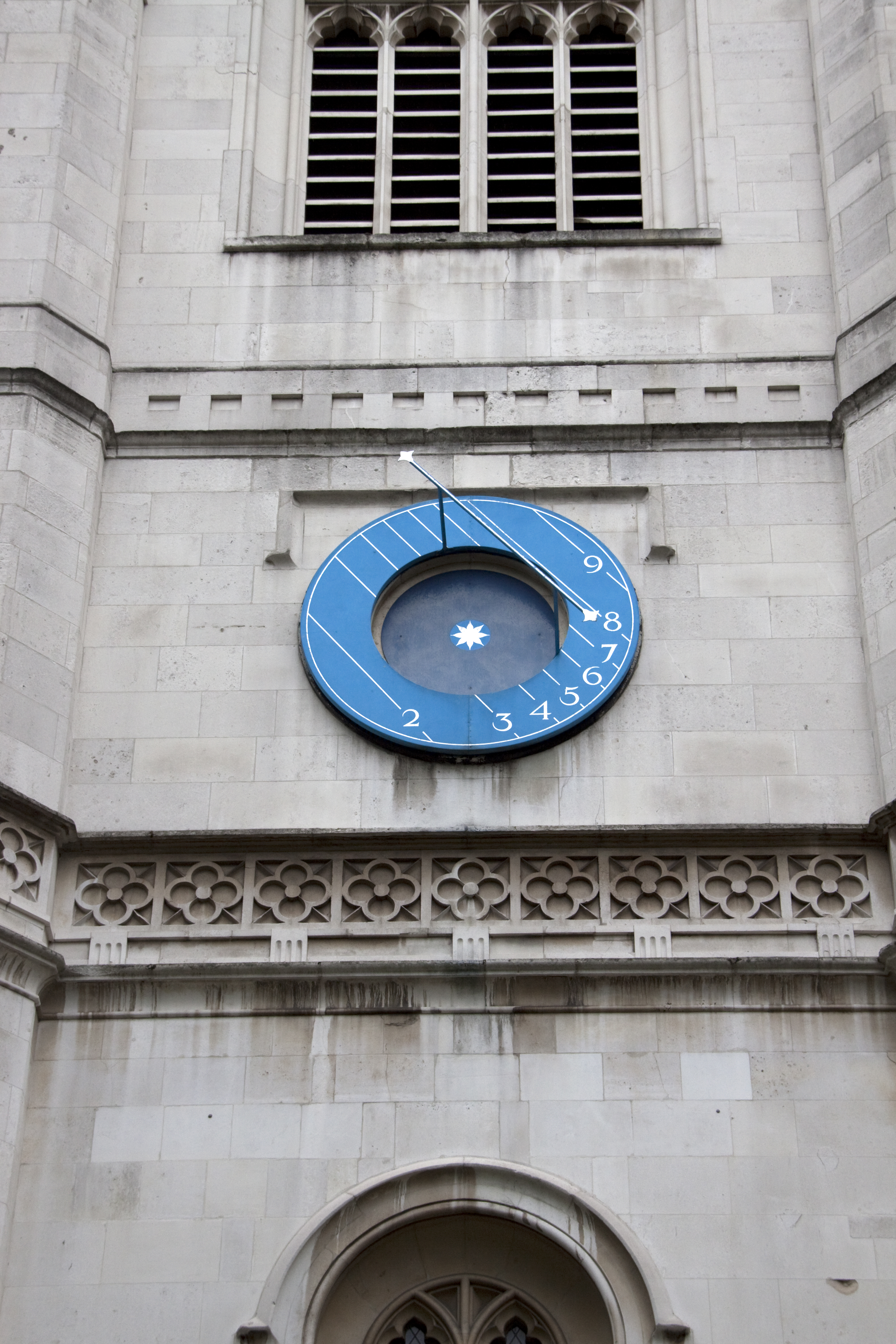

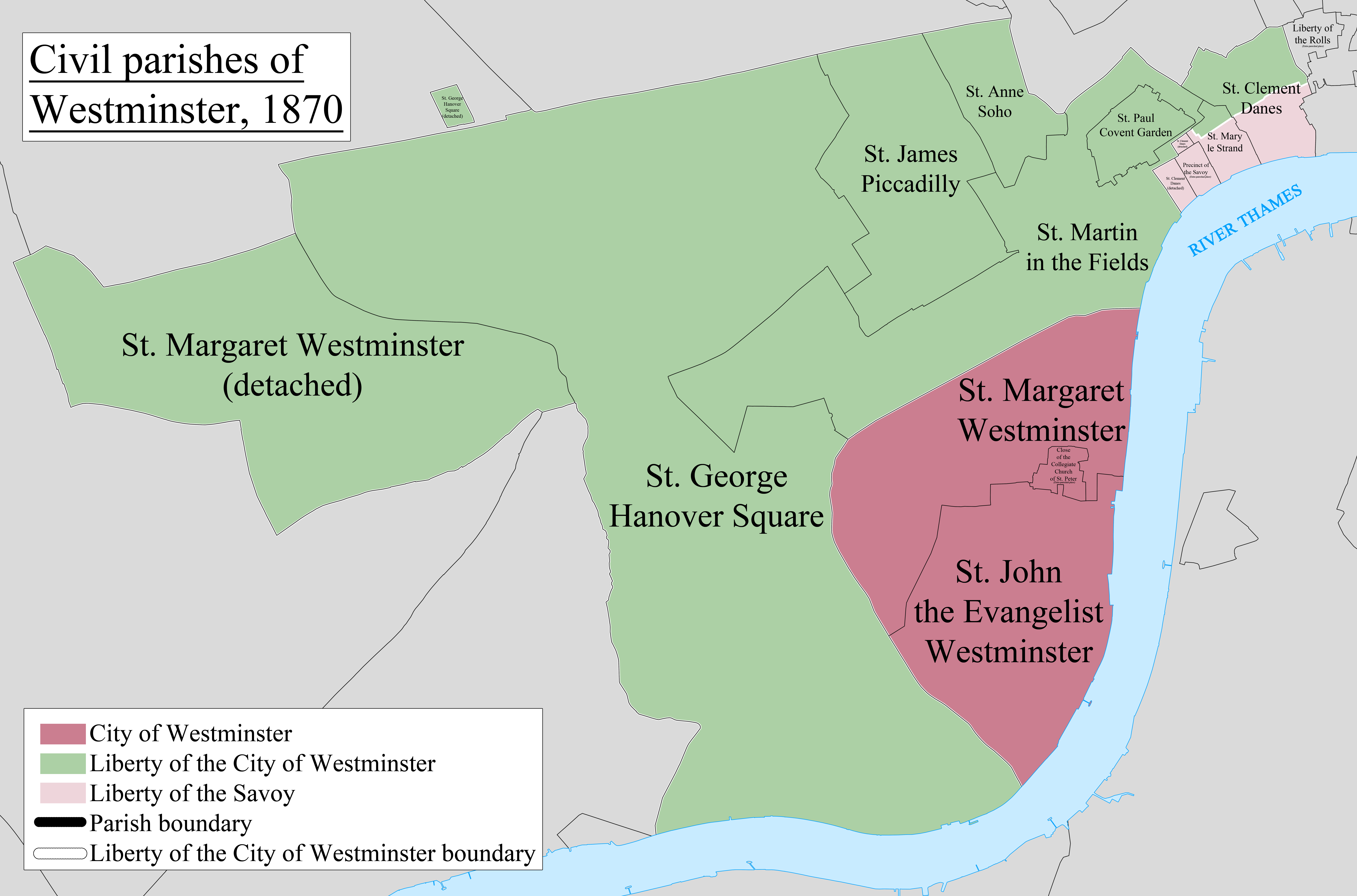
- Area
  - 1881: 9 acres (0.036 km^{2})
- Population
  - 1881: 249
  - 1901: 231
  - 1921: 194
- History
  - Abolished: 1922
  - Succeeded by: City of Westminster
- Status: Extra-parochial area (until 1858); Civil parish (after 1858)
- Government: Dean and Chapter of Westminster

The Close of the Collegiate Church of St Peter was an extra-parochial area, and later civil parish, in the metropolitan area of London, England. It corresponded to the area of Westminster Abbey and was an enclave between the parishes of St Margaret and St John, within the City and Liberty of Westminster. The Collegiate Church of St Peter is an alternative name for Westminster Abbey. At the 1921 census (the last before the abolition of the parish), Close of the Collegiate Church of St Peter had a population of 194.

In 1875 it was added to the St George's Poor Law Union, which also included the parishes of St George Hanover Square, St Margaret and St John.

In 1889 the parish became part of the County of London and in 1900 it became part of the Metropolitan Borough of Westminster.

On 1 April 1922 the parish was abolished to form City of Westminster.
