= Westminster St Margaret and St John =

St Margaret and St John St Margaret (until 1727) Westminster District (1855–1887)
- Civil parish
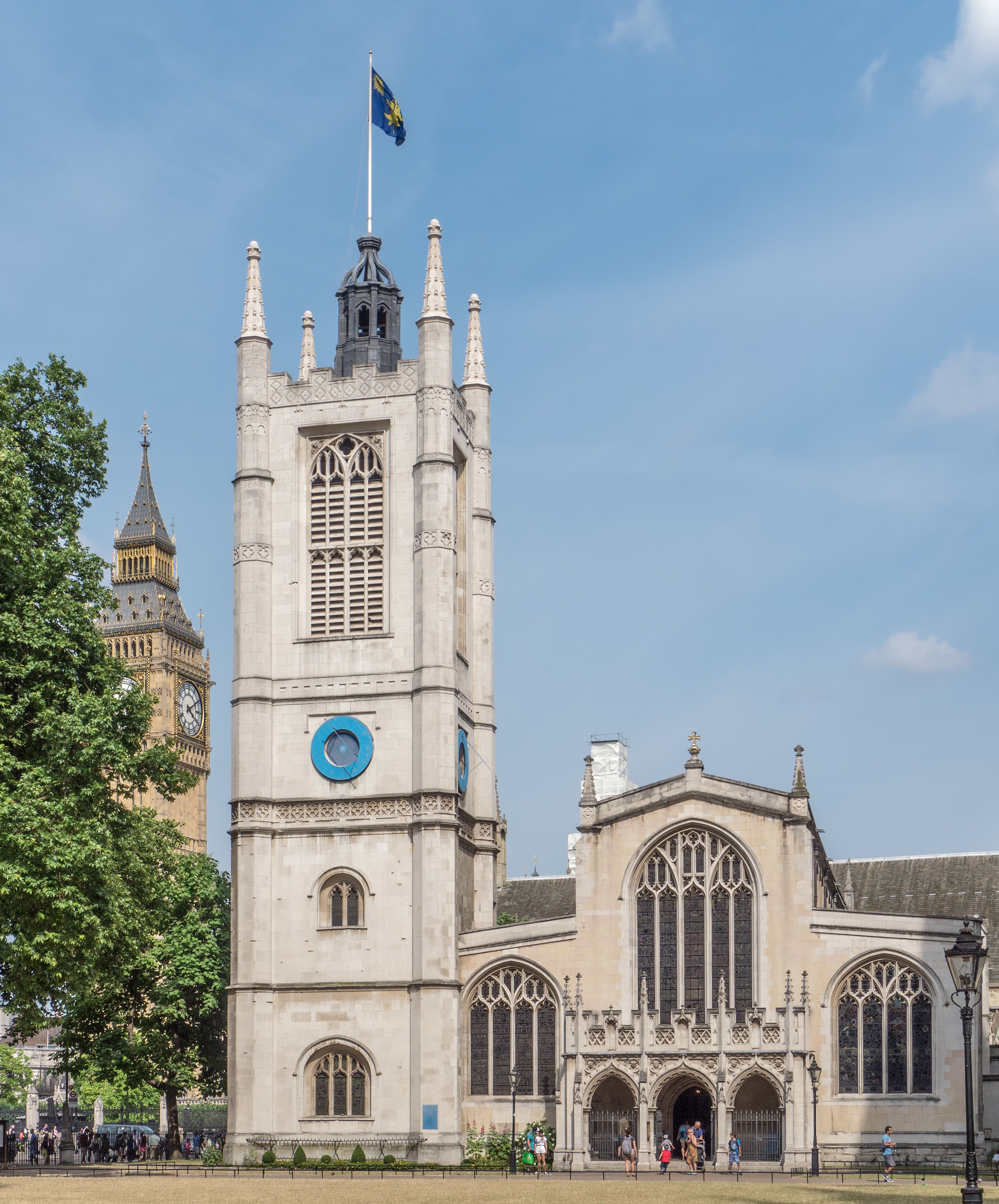

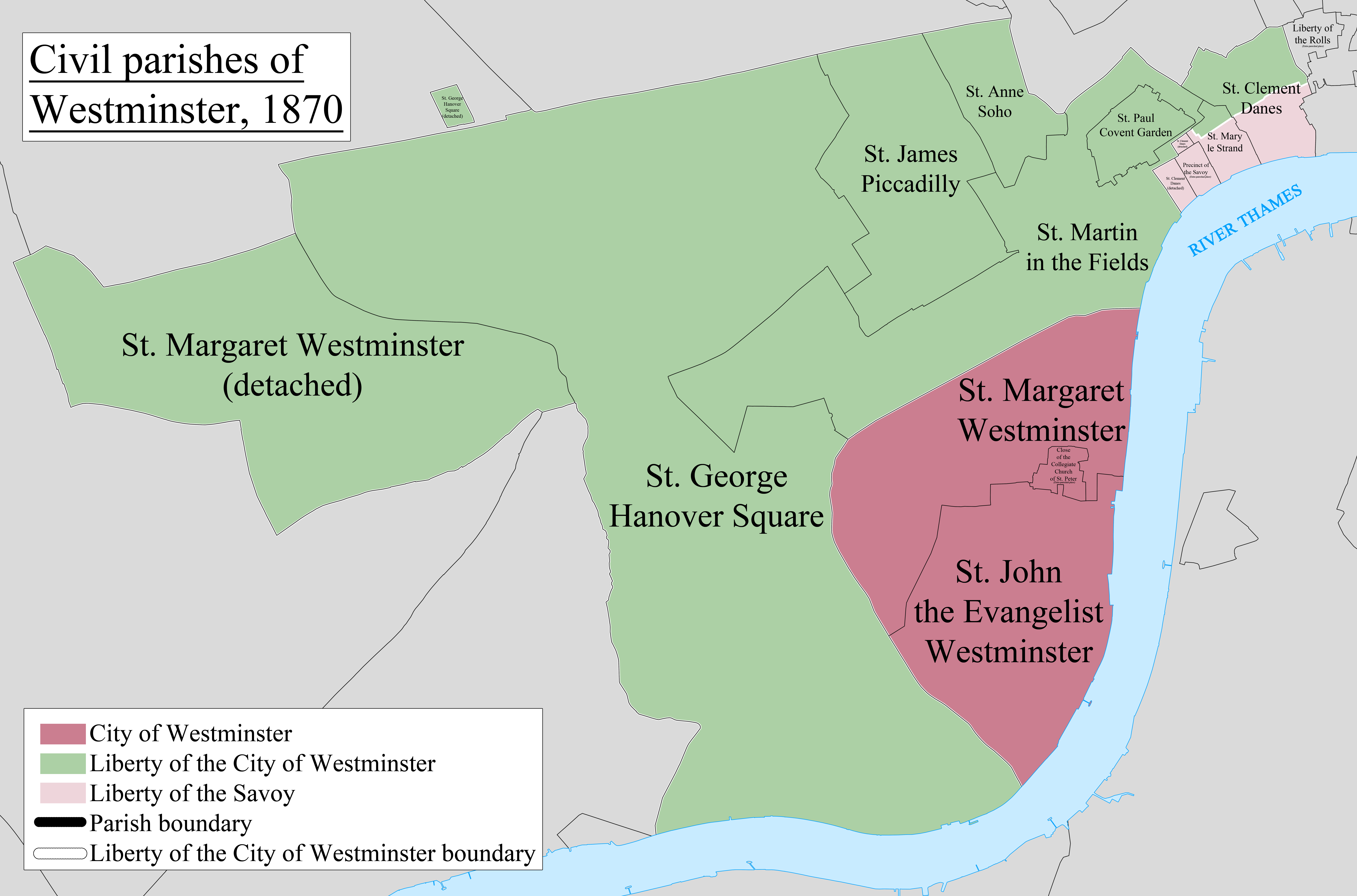
- Area
  - 1881: 815 acres (3.30 km^{2})
  - 1901: 766 acres (3.10 km^{2})
  - 1921: 767 acres (3.10 km^{2})
  - Coordinates: 51.4995°N 0.1333°W
- Population
  - 1881: 59,926
  - 1901: 51,068
  - 1921: 39,916
- Density
  - 1881: 73.53/acre
  - 1901: 66.67/acre
  - 1921: 52.04/acre
- History
  - Origin: Ancient parish
  - Created: 10th century
  - Abolished: 1922
  - Succeeded by: City of Westminster
- Status: District (1855–1887)
- Government: St Margaret Vestry (16th century–1727); St Margaret and St John Vestry (1727–1855); Westminster District Board of Works (1855–1887); St Margaret and St John Combined Vestry (1887–1900)
  - Type: Vestry
  - HQ: Town Hall, Caxton Street
- Seal of the united vestry in 1888
- Contained within
  - City and liberty: Westminster (until 1900)
  - Metropolitan borough: Westminster (1900–1922)
  - Poor Law Union: St George's (1870–1913); City of Westminster (1913–1922)
- Subdivisions
  - Type: Parishes (after 1727)
  - Units: St John; St Margaret

St Margaret was an ancient parish in the City and Liberty of Westminster and the county of Middlesex. It included the core of modern Westminster, including the Palace of Westminster and the area around, but not including Westminster Abbey. It was divided into St Margaret's and St John's in 1727, to coincide with the building of the Church of St John the Evangelist, constructed by the Commission for Building Fifty New Churches in Smith Square to meet the demands of the growing population, but there continued to be a single vestry for the parishes of St Margaret and St John. This was reformed in 1855 by the Metropolis Management Act, and the two parishes formed the Westminster District until 1887. St Margaret and St John became part of the County of London in 1889. The vestry was abolished in 1900, to be replaced by Westminster City Council, but St Margaret and St John continued to have a nominal existence until 1922. At the 1921 census (the last before the abolition of the parish), Westminster St Margaret had a population of 39,916.

== Governance ==
A map showing the wards of Westminster Metropolitan Borough as they appeared in 1916.

St Margaret was an ancient parish, governed by a vestry and within the City and Liberty of Westminster. Before 1542 the parish included territory between the church of St Clement Danes and the Palace of Westminster, that became part of the parish of St Martin in the Fields.

The Commission for Building Fifty New Churches was set up to build new churches for populous parishes in the London area and Church of St John the Evangelist was completed in 1728. To coincide with this, a new parish of St John the Evangelist for civil and ecclesiastical purposes was split off from St Margaret in 1727.

Despite the split, the two parishes continued to be governed by a single vestry and were commonly known as Westminster St Margaret and St John.

The two parishes were grouped into the Westminster District in 1855 when they came within the area of responsibility of the Metropolitan Board of Works. St Margaret elected 30 members the district board and St John elected 27 members.

Under the Metropolis Management Act 1855 any parish that exceeded 2,000 ratepayers was to be divided into wards; as such the parishes of both St Margaret Westminster and St John the Evangelist within the Westminster District Boards of Works were divided into three wards each (electing vestrymen): St Margaret No. 1 (12), St Margaret No. 2 (9), St Margaret No. 3 (15), St John the Evangelist No. 1 (9), St John the Evangelist No. 2 (15) and St John the Evangelist No. 3 (12).

The local authority was renamed as the St Margaret and St John Combined Vestry in 1887.

In 1889 the parishes became part of the County of London. The united parishes unsuccessfully petitioned for incorporation as a municipal borough on 19 January 1897. In 1900 they became part of the Metropolitan Borough of Westminster. On 1 April 1922 the parish was abolished to form City of Westminster.

== Libraries ==
The parish vestry was the first in London to adopt the Public Libraries Act 1855. It held a public meeting in 1856, achieved the required two thirds in favour of providing a library and appointed a librarian the same year. The Westminster Public Library on Great Smith Street opened in 1857. In 1858 a further library was opened in Trevor Square, Knightsbridge.

== Geography ==
The main part of the parish fronted the River Thames to the east. St Margaret's was north of St John's. The parish of St Margaret had a detached part of similar size to its west, by the allegiance of a medieval manor, commonly named Kensington Gore and including the northwest of what is today considered Knightsbridge and Kensington Palace.

In times of monasticism and monarchicism, the geographic extent had a maximum of three extra-parochial areas within, namely:

- The Close of the Collegiate Church of St Peter containing Westminster Abbey, officially its own precinct and sanctuary rather than ex-pariochial altogether.
- Privy Gardens (1831 census records)
- Verge of the Palaces of St James and Whitehall (1841 census records)
  - Whitehall (1831 census records)

== Poor law ==
Westminster St Margaret and St John was a local act parish and so remained a single unit for administration of the New Poor Law. Following the Metropolitan Poor Act 1867 (30 & 31 Vict. c. 6), it joined with St George Hanover Square for this purpose in 1870 as the St George's Union.

== Population ==
The population history is typical for a central district of London, growing until the 19th century and then declining as transport improvements caused movement to the suburbs. The population peak was in 1871.

Year	1801	1811	1821	1831	1841	1851	1871	1881	1891	1901	1911	1921
Population	17,508	19,202	22,568	25,529	30,489	31,314	66,050	59,926	55,539	51,068	47,692	39,916
