= Thomas Josiah Thompson =

Sierra Leonean lawyer and politician

Thomas Josiah Thompson (1867–1941), was a Sierra Leonean lawyer and politician who served as Mayor of the Freetown City Council. He was the founder and owner of the Sierra Leone Daily Mail, which operated from 1933 to 1994.

== Works ==
- The Jubilee and Centenary Volume of Fourah Bay College, Freetown, Sierra Leone. 1930.
