= James Monroe Jones =

James Monroe Jones (1821/22–1906), born enslaved in North Carolina, purchased his freedom and was eventually able to graduate from Oberlin. He was a gunsmith and engraver with a profitable shop in Chatham, Ontario, where he served as a justice of the peace. He was the only African-American gunsmith in Canada. He prepared a presentation set of derringers for Albert Edward, Prince of Wales during the latter's visit to Canada, but they were never presented because the organizers learned of his skin color.

In his final years he moved to his son's home in Ann Arbor, Michigan, where he died aged 85.
