= First Pan-African Conference =

1900 international conference held in London, England

- Date: 23–25 July 1900
- Duration: Three days
- Venue: Westminster Town Hall
- Location: London, England
- Theme: Anti-racism, self-government
- Participants: 47+ delegates and participants, inc. Samuel Coleridge-Taylor, John Alcindor, Benito Sylvain, Dadabhai Naoroji, John Archer, Henry Francis Downing, W. E. B. Du Bois, George James Christian, Richard E. Phipps, Anna J. Cooper, Anna H. Jones, Bishop Alexander Walters

The First Pan-African Conference was held in London, England, from 23 to 25 July 1900 (just prior to the Paris Exhibition of 1900 "in order to allow tourists of African descent to attend both events"). Organized primarily by the Trinidadian barrister Henry Sylvester Williams, the conference took place in Westminster Town Hall (now Caxton Hall) and was attended by 37 delegates and about 10 other participants and observers from Africa, the West Indies, the US and the UK, including Samuel Coleridge-Taylor (the youngest delegate), John Alcindor, Benito Sylvain, Dadabhai Naoroji, John Archer, Henry Francis Downing, Anna H. Jones, Anna Julia Cooper, and W. E. B. Du Bois, with Bishop Alexander Walters of the AME Zion Church taking the chair.

Du Bois played a leading role, drafting a letter ("Address to the Nations of the World") to European leaders appealing to them to struggle against racism, to grant colonies in Africa and the West Indies the right to self-government and demanding political and other rights for African Americans.

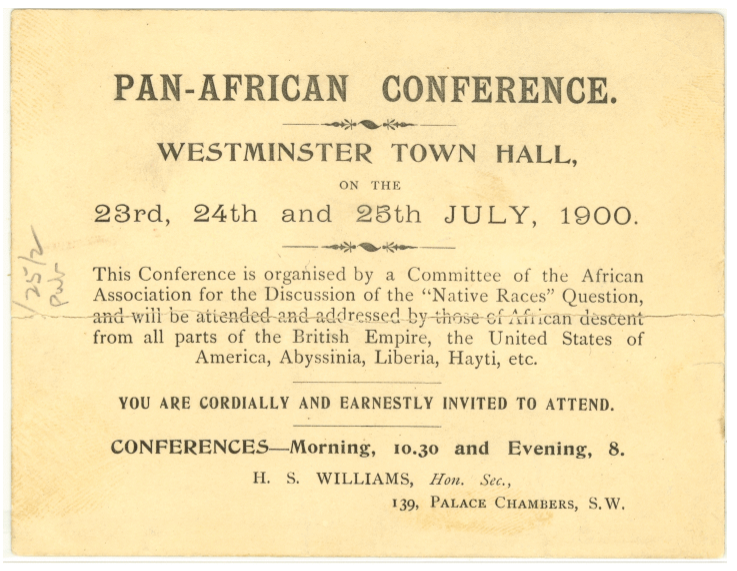
Invitation to the Pan-African Conference at Westminster Town Hall, July 1900

== Background ==
On 24 September 1897, Henry Sylvester Williams had been instrumental in founding in London the African Association (not to be confused with the Association for Promoting the Discovery of the Interior Parts of Africa), in response to the European partition of Africa that followed the 1884-85 Congress of Berlin. The formation of the association marked an early stage in the development of the anti-colonial movement, and was established to encourage the unity of Africans and people of African descent, particularly in territories of the British Empire, concerning itself with injustices in Britain's African and Caribbean colonies. In March 1898, the association issued a circular calling for a pan-African conference. Booker T. Washington, who had been travelling in the UK in the summer of 1899, wrote in a letter to African-American newspapers:

"In connection with the assembling of so many Negroes in London from different parts of the world, a very important movement has just been put upon foot. It is known as the Pan-African Conference. Representatives from Africa, the West Indian Islands and other parts of the world, asked me to meet them a few days ago with a view to making a preliminary program for this conference, and we had a most interesting meeting. It is surprising to see the strong intellectual mould which many of these Africans and West Indians possess. The object and character of the Pan-African Conference is best told in the words of the resolution, which was adopted at the meeting referred to, viz: 'In view of the widespread ignorance which is prevalent in England about the treatment of native races under European and American rule, the African Association, which consists of members of the race resident in England and which has been in existence for nearly two years, have resolved during the Paris Exposition of 1900 (which many representatives of the race may be visiting) to hold a conference in London in the month of May of the said year, in order to take steps to influence public opinion on existing proceedings and conditions affecting the welfare of the natives in various parts of Africa, the West Indies and the United States.' The resolution is signed by Mr H. Mason Joseph, President, and Mr H. Sylvester Williams as Honourable Secretary. The Honourable Secretary will be pleased to hear from representative natives who are desirous of attending at an early date. He may be addressed, Common Room, Grey's (sic) Inn, London, W.C."

== Conference concerns and issues ==
When the First Pan-African Conference opened on Monday, 23 July 1900, in London's Westminster Town Hall, Bishop Alexander Walters in his opening address, "The Trials and Tribulations of the Coloured Race in America", noted that "for the first time in history black people had gathered from all parts of the globe to discuss and improve the condition of their race, to assert their rights and organize so that they might take an equal place among nations." The Bishop of London, Mandell Creighton, gave a speech of welcome "referring to 'the benefits of self-government' which Britain must confer on 'other races ... as soon as possible'."

Speakers over the three days addressed a variety of aspects of racial discrimination. Among the papers delivered were: "Conditions Favouring a High Standard of African Humanity" (C. W. French of St. Kitts), "The Preservation of Racial Equality" (Anna H. Jones, from Kansas City, Missouri), "The Necessary Concord to be Established between Native Races and European Colonists" (Benito Sylvain, Haitian aide-de-camp to the Ethiopian emperor), "The Negro Problem in America" (Anna J. Cooper, from Washington), "The Progress of our People" (John E. Quinlan of St. Lucia) and "Africa, the Sphinx of History, in the Light of Unsolved Problems" (D. E. Tobias from the USA). Other topics included Richard Phipps' complaint of discrimination against black people in the Trinidadian civil service and an attack by William Meyer, a medical student at Edinburgh University, on pseudo-scientific racism. Discussions followed the presentation of the papers, and on the last day George James Christian, a law student from Dominica, led a discussion on the subject "Organized Plunder and Human Progress Have Made Our Race Their Battlefield", saying that in the past "Africans had been kidnapped from their land, and in South Africa and Rhodesia slavery was being revived in the form of forced labour."

The conference culminated in the conversion of the African Association (formed by Sylvester Williams in 1897) into the Pan-African Association, and the implementation of a unanimously adopted "Address to the Nations of the World", sent to various heads of state where people of African descent were living and suffering oppression. The address implored the United States and the imperial European nations to "acknowledge and protect the rights of people of African descent" and to respect the integrity and independence of "the free Negro States of Abyssinia, Liberia, Haiti, etc." Signed by Walters (President of the Pan-African Association), the Canadian Rev. Henry B. Brown (Vice-President), Williams (General Secretary) and Du Bois (Chairman of the Committee on the Address), the document contained the phrase "The problem of the Twentieth Century is the problem of the colour-line", which Du Bois would use three years later in the "Forethought" of his book The Souls of Black Folk (1903).

In September, the delegates petitioned Queen Victoria through the British government to look into the treatment of Africans in South Africa and Rhodesia, including specified acts of injustice perpetrated by whites there, namely:

1. The degrading and illegal compound system of labour in vogue in Kimberley and Rhodesia.
2. The so-called indenture, i.e., legalized bondage of African men and women and children to white colonists.
3. The system of compulsory labour in public works.
4. The "pass" or docket system used for people of colour.
5. Local by-laws tending to segregate and degrade Africans such as the curfew; the denial to Africans of the use of footpaths; and the use of separate public conveyances.
6. Difficulties in acquiring real property.
7. Difficulties in obtaining the franchise.

The response eventually received by Sylvester Williams on 17 January 1901 stated:

"Sir. I am directed by Mr Secretary [Joseph] Chamberlain to state that he has received the Queen's commands to inform you that the Memorial of the Pan-African Conference requesting the situation of the native races in South Africa, has been laid before Her Majesty, and that she was graciously pleased to command him to return an answer to it on behalf of her government.

2. Mr. Chamberlain accordingly desires to assure the members of the Pan-African Conference that, it settling the lines on which the administration of the conquered territories is to be conducted, Her Majesty's Government will not overlook the interests and welfare of the native races.

Days later, Victoria responded more personally, instructing her private secretary, Arthur Bigge, to write, which he did on 21 January — the day before the Queen died. Although the specific injustices in South Africa continued for some time, the conference brought them to the attention of the world.

== Press coverage and local reception ==
The conference was reported in major British newspapers, including The Times and the Westminster Gazette, which commented that it "marks the initiation of a remarkable movement in history: the negro is at last awake to the potentialities of his future" and quoted Williams as saying: "Our object now is to secure throughout the world the same facilities and privileges for the black as the white man enjoys."

Bishop Alexander Walters recorded in his memoir,

"On Monday, the 23d of July, the conference was invited to a five o'clock tea given by the Reform Cobden Club of London in honor of the delegates, at its headquarters in the St. Ermin Hotel, one of the most elegant in the city. Several members of Parliament and other notables were present. A splendid repast was served, and for two hours the delegates were delightfully entertained by the members and friends of the club.

At 5 o'clock on Tuesday a tea was given in our honor by the late Dr. Creighton, Lord Bishop of London, at his stately palace at Fulham, which has been occupied by the Bishops of London since the fifteenth century. On our arrival at the palace we found his Lordship and one or two other Bishops, with their wives and daughters, waiting to greet us. After a magnificent repast had been served we were conducted through the extensive grounds which surround the palace. Prof. DuBois, M. Benito Sylvain, Messrs. Downing and Calloway, Miss Jones and others moved about the palace and grounds with an ease and elegance that was surprising; one would have thought they were "to the manor born." We found the Lord Bishop not only a brilliant scholar and profound thinker, but an affable Christian gentleman. I am sure our visit to the palace will be long remembered by the delegates as one of the most pleasant in their history.

Through the kindness of Mr. Clark, a member of Parliament, we were invited to tea on Wednesday, at 5 o'clock, on the Terrace of Parliament. After the tea the male members of our party were admitted to the House of Commons, which is considered quite an honor; indeed, the visit to the House of Parliament and tea on the Terrace was the crowning honor of the series. Great credit is due our genial secretary, Mr. H. Sylvester Williams, for these social functions.

Miss Catherine Impey, of London, said she was glad to come in contact with the class of Negroes that composed the Pan-African Conference, and wished that the best and most cultured would visit England and meet her citizens of noble birth, that the adverse opinion which had been created against them in some quarters of late by their enemies might be changed."

== Legacy ==
After the conference ended, Williams set up branches of the Pan-African Association in Jamaica, Trinidad and the USA. He also launched a short-lived journal, The Pan-African, in October 1901. Although plans for the association to meet every two years failed, the 1900 conference encouraged the development of the Pan-African Congress.

As Professor Tony Martin noted, "At least three of the Caribbean delegates later emigrated to Africa. George Christian of Dominica became a successful lawyer and legislator in the Gold Coast (Ghana) where he was a member of the Legislative Council from 1920 to 1940. Richard E. Phipps, the Trinidad barrister, returned home after the conference and emigrated to the Gold Coast in 1911. He remained there until his death around 1926. Williams himself lived in South Africa from 1903 to 1905, and died in Trinidad in 1911."

Under the Pan-African Congress banner, a series of gatherings subsequently took place — in 1919 in Paris, 1921 in London, 1923 in London, 1927 in New York City, 1945 in Manchester, 1974 in Dar es Salaam and 1994 in Kampala — to address the issues facing Africa as a result of European colonization.

A centenary commemorative event was held in London on 25 July 2000, attended by descendants of some of the delegates at the original conference (including Margaret Busby, granddaughter of George Christian, and his great-granddaughter Moira Stuart), as well as descendants of those at the 1945 5th Pan-African Congress in Manchester (such as George Padmore's daughter Blyden Cowart, and Samia Nkrumah, daughter of Kwame Nkrumah).

== See also ==
- The Exhibit of American Negroes at the Exposition Universelle in Paris
- Pan-African Congress
- Pan-Africanism
- First Universal Races Congress
- Niagara Movement
