= Pan-African Congress =

Series of meetings to address issues facing Africa

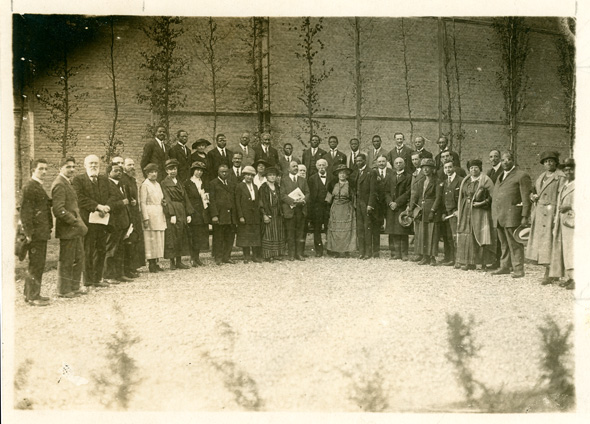
Members of the Second Pan African Conference, Brussels, 1921

The Pan-African Congress (PAC) is a regular series of meetings that originally took place on the back of the Pan-African Conference held in London, England, in 1900.

The Pan-African Congress first gained a reputation as a peacemaker for decolonization in Africa and in the West Indies, and made a significant advance for the Pan-African cause. Among the group's primary demands from the outset was the cessation of colonial rule and racial discrimination. The Congress opposed imperialism and called for human rights and economic equality. The manifesto issued by the PAC outlined its political and economic demands for a new global context of international cooperation, emphasizing the necessity to tackle the challenges Africa faced due to widespread European colonization.

Congresses have taken place in 1919 in Paris (France); 1921 in Brussels (Belgium), London and Paris; 1923 in Lisbon (Portugal) and London; 1927 in New York City (United States); 1945 in Manchester (England); 1974 in Dar es Salaam (Tanzania); 1994 in Kampala (Uganda); 2014 in Johannesburg (South Africa); and 2025 in Lomé (Togo)

== Background ==
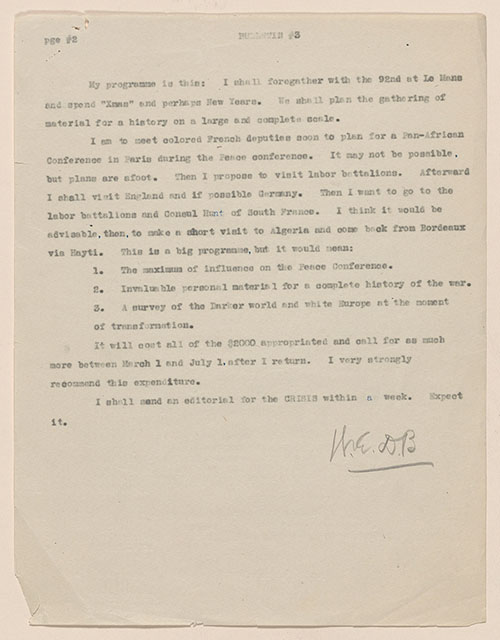
Letter from W. E. B. Du Bois to the NAACP, January 1919, about planning the First Pan African Congress.

Pan-Africanism as a philosophy was created as early as the late 1700s, seen through the movements of abolition in both the United States and Britain. British writers and abolitionists Ottobah Cugoano and Olaudah Equiano created the foundations for Pan-Africanism in English literature. French-speakers, including Léopold Sédar Senghor, created the idea of Négritude. These ideas refuted the inferiority of Black people. Pan-Africanists believed that both slavery and colonialism were built on negative attitudes towards people of African descent, which in turn, contributed to racism. African Americans were especially frustrated with their slow progress towards racial equality in the United States.

Trinidadian lawyer, Henry Sylvester Williams created the African Association in 1897 to encourage a sense of Pan-African unity in the British Colonies. The African Association published the discrimination and injustices faced by people in the African diaspora. The African Association's work led to the First Pan-African Conference held in London in 1900. That conference, which brought together people who were against racism and colonialism, attracted international attention, though it did not lead to political action on these issues. Attendees of the Pan-African Conference discussed the need to preserve Black cultural identity and for the rights of indigenous people to be recognized by colonizers. W. E. B. Du Bois was one of 30 attendees at this conference, where he described "the color line" as one of the most important issues of the 20th century. The inclusion of Du Bois at the 1900 conference marked him as a developing leader in the Pan-African movement.

During World War I, African-American soldiers fought bravely overseas and people such as Du Bois felt that they should not face racial violence on returning to the United States. Black soldiers also faced discrimination in Europe at the hands of the American Expeditionary Forces during the fighting. Du Bois described the fighting done by Black Americans as a "debt of blood" and that they deserved reparations for slavery and racial violence. He also believed that ensuring a positive future for Africa would be key to helping all Black people around the world. Wilson's Fourteen Points plan gave Du Bois hope that there would be greater opportunities for Black people politically in a future marked by democratic and anti-colonial values. In addition, Du Bois wanted to oppose the influence of the United Negro Improvement Association (UNIA) and Marcus Garvey on any potential proceedings. The U.S. saw Garvey and the UNIA as linked to "Moscow" and Black separatism and Du Bois wanted to avoid that connection. Of all groups that were trying to have a voice during the end of WWI, Du Bois believed he could have "positive political influence".

In December 1918, Du Bois went to France as a representative of the NAACP at the same time as the Paris Peace Conference was taking place at the end of WWI. Many majority groups, including Black people in Europe and Africa, felt that the creation of a League of Nations would lead to positive outcomes for them politically and socially. Du Bois wrote to President Wilson and asked to be a delegate for the Peace Conference to speak on behalf of Black people. Du Bois knew that the fate of some African colonies were going to be discussed at the Peace Conference. He hoped that having a conference of Black representatives from around the world would be heard by the European powers and the European public. He wanted to lobby the governments attending the Peace Conference to ensure better treatment for people of color around the world. Du Bois believed that he could "exert some positive political influence on the power-brokers and decision-makers during the Paris Peace Conference." However, Du Bois was one of many individuals representing various other advocacy groups who also wanted to have a voice at the Peace Conference. Since he was not given permission to speak at the Peace Conference, he decided to create a separate meeting to take place at the same time.

A mass meeting on the future of Africa was held in New York City on 19 January 1919 by the NAACP. At the event, there was wide support for Du Bois to discuss Pan-African issues in Paris during the Peace Conference. Speakers at the New York meeting included William Henry Sheppard, Horace Kallen, and James Weldon Johnson.

== 1919 Paris Congress (First) ==
=== Planning ===
On 19 February 1919, the first Pan-African Congress was organized quickly in Paris by W. E. B. Du Bois, Ida Gibbs Hunt, Edmund Fredericks and Blaise Diagne. Diagne served as the president of the Congress with Du Bois the secretary and Gibbs the assistant secretary. Du Bois created a list of groups he wanted to attend to the congress which included countries who had Black citizens, but he also wanted representatives from other countries as well. Du Bois wanted to petition the Versailles Peace Conference held in Paris at that time to make a case for African colonies to become self-ruling. The Pan-African Congress proposed that Germany should be required to turn over its colonies to an international organization rather than other colonial powers. Unlike the International Council of Women, the Pan-African Congress was unable to send delegates to the Peace Conference, nor were members permitted to serve on commissions. Delegates to the Pan African Congress had no "official status" among world governments or organizations.

Diagne was able to get official permission for the Congress to take place in Paris by persuading Prime Minister Georges Clemenceau of its importance. Dates were set for 12 and 13 February to coincide with the birthday of Abraham Lincoln. Funding for the event came from the NAACP and American fraternal organizations. Mary White Ovington and James Weldon Johnson raised money through solicitations of prominent NAACP supporters. Despite the funding received, the conference took place on a very small budget.

Once the event had permission, American officials in Paris, such as Tasker H. Bliss and George Louis Beer became alarmed. Beer, who was the chief colonial expert working for the U.S., believed that Black people could not govern themselves. A series of telegrams described as "urgent" and "confidential" began to pass between the United States Department of State and American officials in Paris. The French government even later stated that Clemenceau had never approved of the Congress.

There were 57 delegates representing 15 countries, a smaller number than originally intended because British and American governments refused to issue passports to their citizens who had planned on attending. Representatives of the National Equal Rights League including Madam C. J. Walker and William Monroe Trotter were denied passports. It was reported by the U.S. State Department that the French government did not believe the timing was right for a Pan-African Congress. A New York Call writer believed that the U.S. was worried it would be embarrassed by discussions of race relations at the Congress in Paris. Many of the delegates who attended did so on short notice, or by getting through on other types of credentials, such as being journalists. Others, like Gibbs, were already in Europe. Du Bois did not invite Black socialists or working-class leaders to the Congress.

=== Event ===
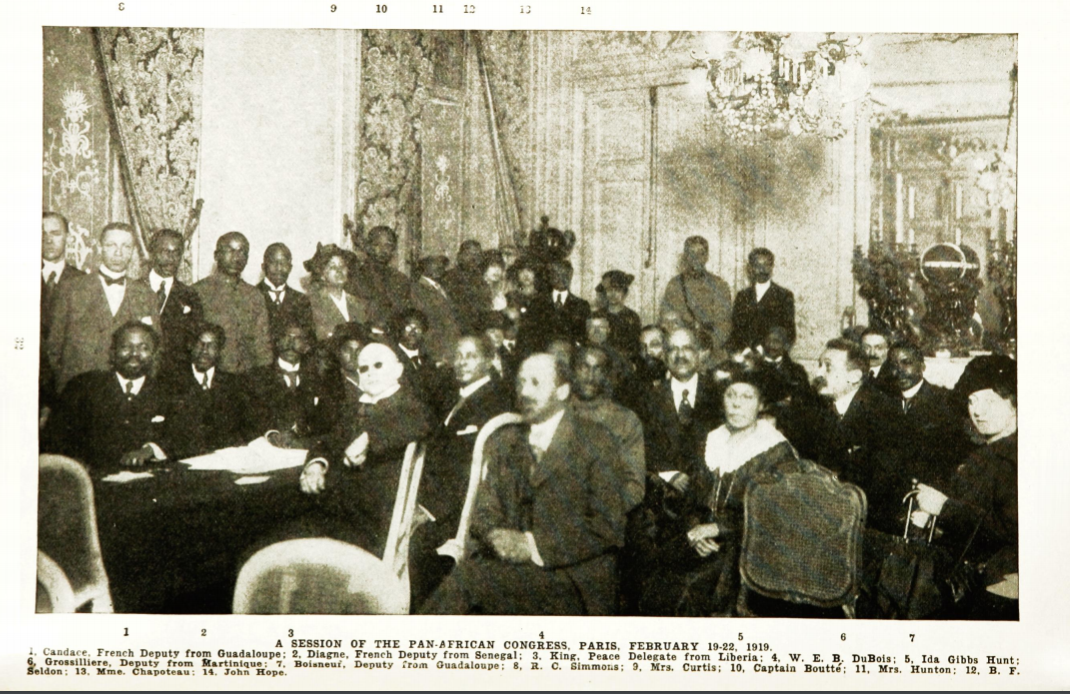
Pan-African Congress in Paris, February 19–22, 1919

Eventually, the Congress took place between 19 and 21 February at the Grand Hotel. There was greater representation from African countries at the First Pan-African Congress than there had been at the 1900 Pan-African Conference. Africa had 12 delegates, with three from Liberia. There were 21 delegates representing Caribbean countries and 16 delegates from the U.S. Delegates to the Congress were middle-class and moderate. Nevertheless, Du Bois was able to create the idea of a Pan African Marxism during the event.

The first speech of the Congress was by Diagne, who said that assimilated Black people from America, Britain and France "were far more advanced than indigenous and "inherently backwards" Africans. In this capacity, he felt that African countries held by Germany should be transferred to a system similar to the colonial system of France. This speech touched on concerns Black intellectuals from Europe and America felt in being compared to the stereotypes of African people as primitive. It also placed significant value on Black people who had been "civilized" by colonizing powers. For Diagne, Germany should give up their colonies not because colonialism was bad, but because German governance was not good. After Diagne's speech, Portuguese representative Alfredo Andrade, praised French democracy and its inclusion of Black people in government. Other representatives to the Pan-African Congress also praised France for having Black representation in politics and good relations with Black people anecdotally. Andrade, Diagne, Gratien Candace, Achille René-Boisneuf, and Joseph Lagrosillière all felt that there was "no room for a diasporan political consciousness because they saw the French Third Republic's empire as the best current opportunity for the realization of black rights within their constituencies." Adherence to a "benevolent" nation was seen as a practical approach to helping improve the lives of Black people they represented.

Liberian delegate, Charles D. B. King, spoke about the importance of developing his country as a free state, emphasizing the importance of a shared African heritage. Because of American support, however, Liberia did not want to agitate against the United States. Helen Noble Curtis gave a speech called "The Use of African Troops in Europe" which described many racist experiences Black soldiers fighting in WWI encountered in hospitals and other institutions. Curtis pleaded for the world to recognize that justice is not separate: it should be the same for all people regardless of skin color. Addie Waites Hunton reminded delegates that it was important to include women in the Pan-African proceedings.

=== Outcomes ===
The congress eventually adopted several resolutions, especially related to people living under colonialism. They advocated for self-determination of African people except where "existing practices were directly contradictory to best established principles of civilization." It was felt that Africa should be granted home rule and Africans should take part in governing their countries as fast as their development permits until at some specified time in the future. Resolutions were sent to the press in France, Britain and the United States. The Congress recommended the creation of a multi-lingual, international publication, the Black Review. It was also expected that delegates would plan for the next Pan-African Congress and that this could be a continuing discussion. Du Bois also hoped for the creation of a world organization, the Pan-African Association.

It was reported that there was little news coverage of the Congress in the French press, but one newspaper in Paris called Du Bois a "disciple of Garvey". West African colonies under British rule barely reported on the event. However, European press did run information about the Congress in the weeks prior to the event. Black people in the United States "generally approved of the actions of Du Bois as reported in the newspapers." Paul Otlet, a Belgian peace activist, wrote an article in La Patrie Belge proposing that European powers return German colonies to African people. When Du Bois wrote about the Congress in The Crisis and in his reports to the NAACP, he did not give a full view of actual nature of the speeches and implied criticism of the United States' racial problems that did not take place at the conference. Instead, he focused on "black solidarity" over reporting other content of the discussions. One conference attendee, the French Africanist Maurice Delafosse, wrote that the French government was largely tolerant of the ideas expressed at the Congress. Harry F. Worley, a white Virginian working for the U.S. State Department in Paris, expressed greater alarm at the "so-called Pan-African Congress": he reported that he had heard that "speeches of the American Negroes were highly inflammatory and condemnatory of the social conditions in the United States".

Du Bois sent a letter to Winston Churchill in 1921, where he enclosed the resolutions adopted at this first Congress in 1919. Du Bois also sent the resolutions to Beer and Edward M. House who served as advisors to President Wilson.

=== Delegates ===
Among the delegates were:

- Alfredo Andrade, Portugal.
- John Archer, Britain.
- Matthew Virgil Boutte, United States.
- Eliezer Cadet, Haiti
- Gratien Candace.
- Louise Chapoteau, France.
- Anna J. Cooper.
- Helen Noble Curtis, United States.
- Blaise Diagne, Senegal, and French Commissioner General of the Ministry of Colonies.
- W. E. B. Du Bois, NAACP delegate.
- Henry Franklin-Bouillon, France.
- M. Edmund Fitzgerald Fredericks, Universal Negro Improvement Association (UNIA) delegate.
- Amy Jacques Garvey.
- Tertullien Guilbaud, Minister of Haiti in France.
- John Hope, United States.
- Ida Gibbs Hunt, United States.
- Addie Hunton, United States.
- George Rubin Hutto, United States.
- George Jackson, United States and Congo.
- William Jernagin, United States.
- Charles D. B. King, Liberia.
- Joseph Lagrosillière, Gaudeloupe.
- Rayford Logan, United States.
- Robert Russa Moton, United States.
- Sol Plaatje, South Africa. (Possibly.)
- Achille René-Boisneuf, Martinique.
- Charles Edward Russell, United States.
- Benjamin F. Seldon, United States.
- Roscoe Conklin Simmons, United States.
- Joel Elias Spingarn, United States.
- Cyrille Van Overbergh, Belgian Peace Commission.
- William English Walling, United States.
- Richard R. Wright

== 1921 Brussels, London and Paris Congress (Second) ==
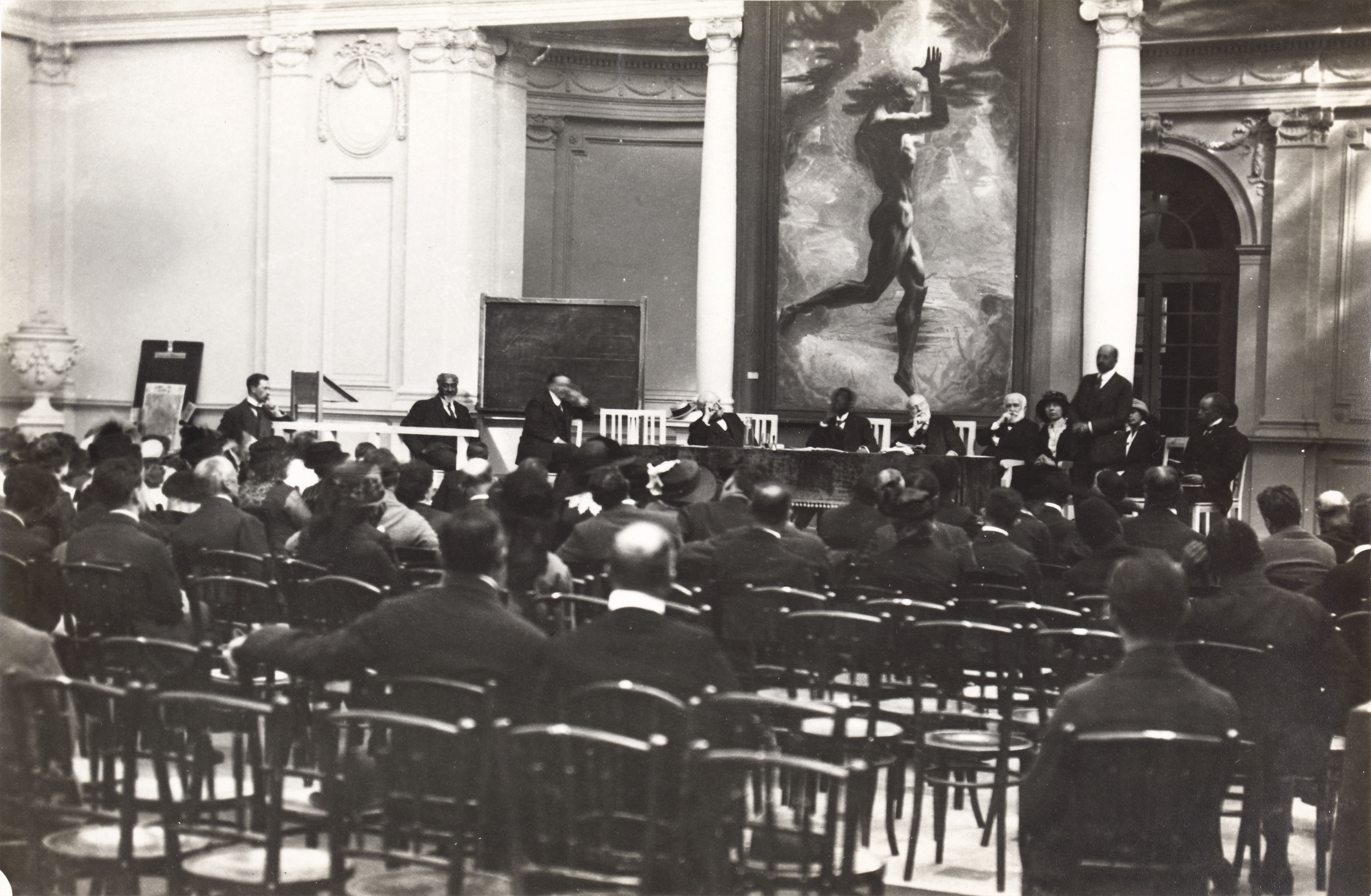
Session in the Palais Mondial, Brussels, 1921

In 1921, the Second Pan-African Congress met in several sessions in London, Brussels and Paris, during August (28, 29, and 31) and September (2, 3, 5 and 6). As W. E. B. Du Bois reported in The Crisis in November that year, represented at this congress were "26 different groups of people of Negro descent: namely, British Nigeria, Gold Coast and Sierra Leone; the Egyptian Sudan, British East Africa, former German East Africa; French Senegal, the French Congo and Madagascar; Belgian Congo; Portuguese St. Thomé, Angola and Mozambique; Liberia; Abyssinia; Haiti; British Jamaica and Grenada; French Martinique and Guadeloupe; British Guiana; the United States of America, Negroes resident in England, France, Belgium and Portugal, and fraternal visitors from India, Morocco, the Philippines and Annam." There was an Indian revolutionary who took part, Shapurji Saklatvala, and a journalist from the Gold Coast named W. F. Hutchinson who spoke. This session of the Congress was the most focused for change of all the meetings thus far. At the London session, resolutions were adopted, later restated by Du Bois in his "Manifesto To the League of Nations":

If we are coming to recognize that the great modern problem is to correct maladjustment in the distribution of wealth, it must be remembered that the basic maladjustment is in the outrageously unjust distribution of world income between the dominant and suppressed peoples; in the rape of land and raw material, and the monopoly of technique and culture. And in this crime white labor is particeps criminis with white capital. Unconsciously and consciously, carelessly and deliberately, the vast power of the white labor vote in modern democracies has been cajoled and flattered into imperialistic schemes to enslave and debauch black, brown and yellow labor.

The only dissenting voices were these of Blaise Diagne and Gratien Candace, French politicians of African and Guadeloupean descent, who represented Senegal and Guadeloupe in the French Chamber of Deputies. They soon abandoned the idea of Pan-Africanism because they advocated equal rights inside the French citizenship and thought the London Manifesto declaration too dangerously extreme.

American Helen Noble Curtis acted as the sole representative for Liberia during this conference.

=== Planning ===
In 1920, Du Bois secured 3,000 dollars from the NAACP for the creation of a "Pan-African fund". He planned to have more African representatives at this event. Paul Panda Farnana introduced Du Bois to colonial leaders in Brussels. Imperial and colonial powers were worried about the American delegates supporting radical and revolutionary ideas.

=== Event ===
The London meeting took place in Methodist Central Hall, Westminster and the Paris meeting happened at the Salles des Ingènieurs. The Brussels sessions were hosted at the Palais Mondial. The Congress met on August 28 and 29 at the Central Hall with around 113 people in attendance and 41 delegates.

=== Outcomes ===
The press in the British colony of the Gold Coast completely denounced the entire 1921 Congress. The Belgian press targeted Garvey and links to the UNIA and the Congress due to "fears of disruption in the Congo". This led to fears among businesses and the government in Brussels that the Congress would be a radical event that would advocate for the overthrow of colonial rule. Panda Farnana even tried suing the newspaper, L'Avenir Colonial Belge, to court for "having smeared and discredited the Pan-African Congress." The smear campaign made many in Brussels see the meeting as a "gathering of dangerous agitators who, like their leader Marcus Garvey, were bent on freeing Africa from European rule." However, Garvey saw the Congress as little more than a joke and sharply criticized it and Du Bois loudly and publicly.

=== Delegates ===
- Anna J. Cooper.
- Addie E. Dillard.
- Amy Jacques Garvey.
- George Rubin Hutto, United States.
- Rayford Logan, United States.
- Albert Marryshow, Grenada.

== 1923 Lisbon and London Congress (Third) ==
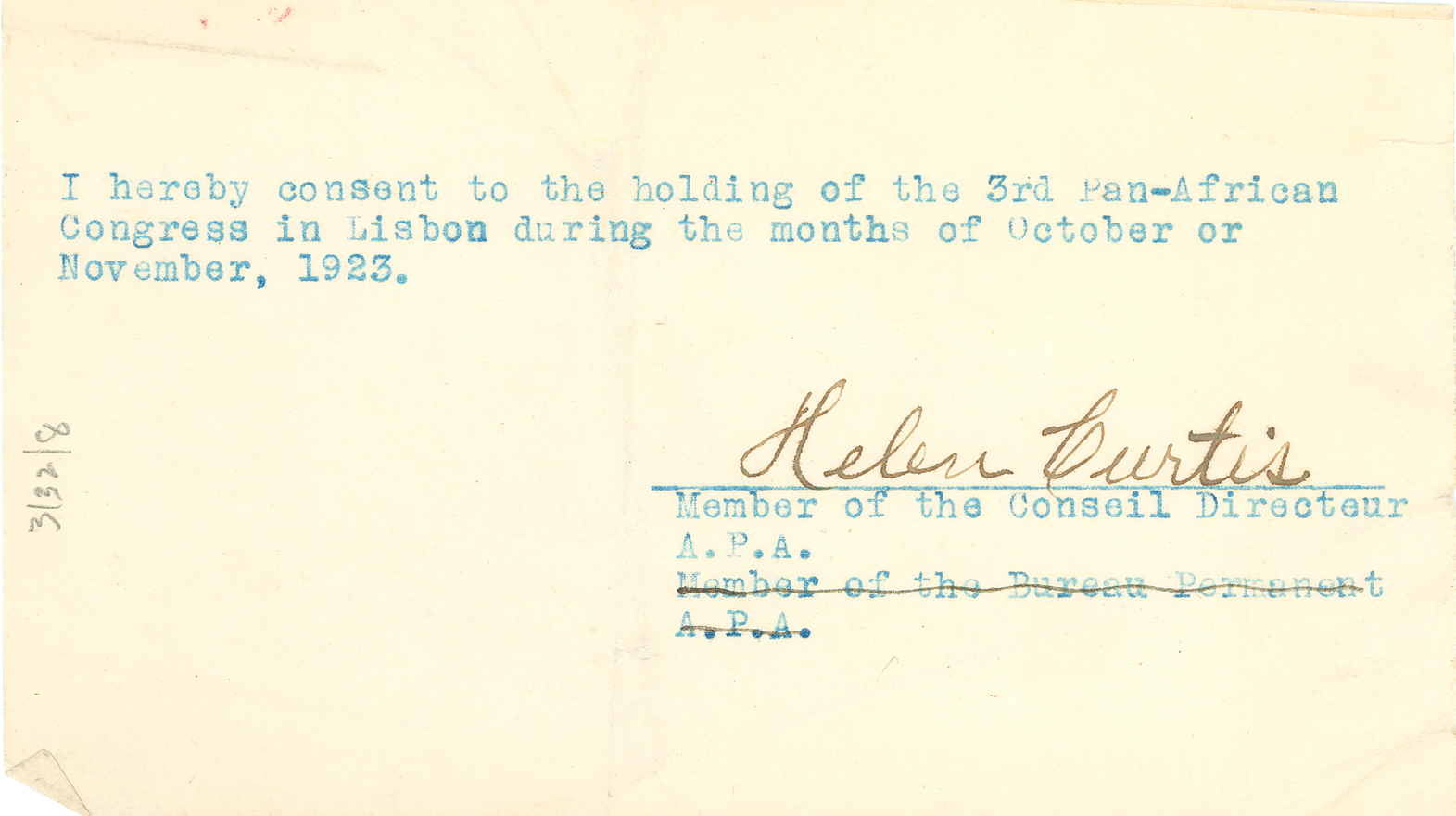
Helen Noble Curtis – Agreement to hold the third Pan-African Congress in Lisbon, 1921

In 1923, the Third Pan-African Congress was held in London (7 and 8 November) and in Lisbon (1 and 2 December). Helen Noble Curtis was an important planner of the Lisbon event, which was smaller than the others. The London Congress was held at Denison House. This meeting also repeated the demands such as self-rule, the problems in the Diaspora and the African-European relationship. The following was addressed at the meeting:

- The development of Africa should be for the benefit of Africans and not merely for the profits of Europeans.
- There should be home rule and a responsible government for British West Africa and the British West Indies.
- The Abolition of the pretension of a white minority to dominate a black majority in Kenya, Rhodesia and South Africa.
- Lynching and mob law in the US should be suppressed.

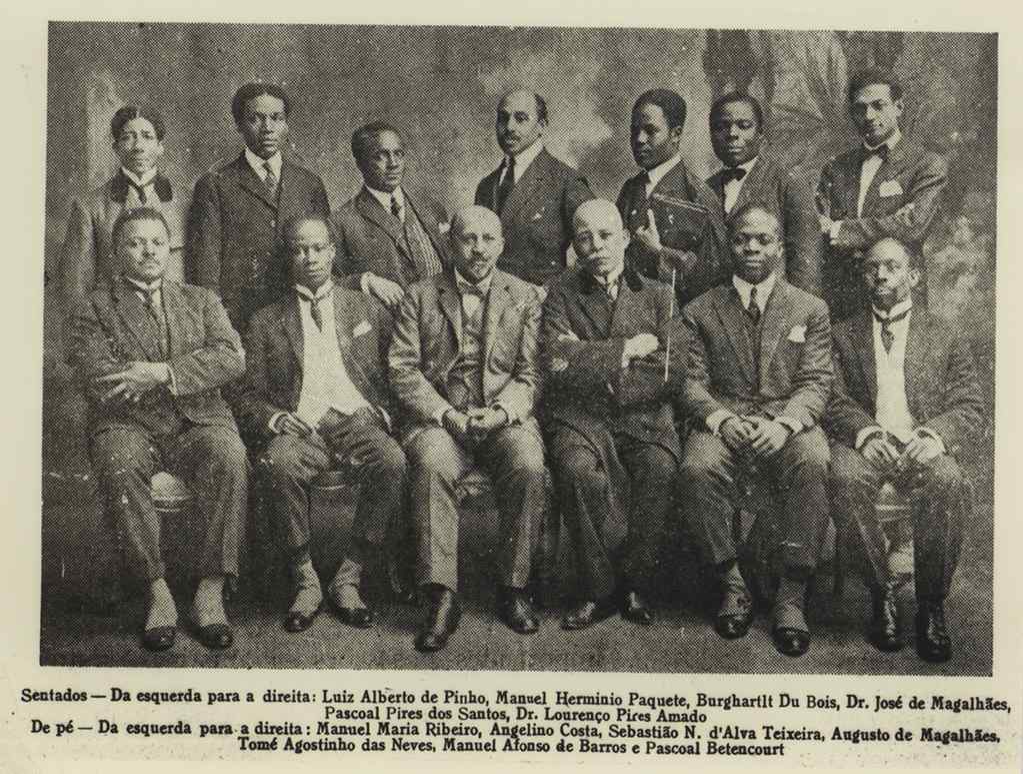
Delegates of the 1923 Pan-African Congress, Lisbon.

Before the Congress met in London, Isaac Béton of the French Committee wrote a letter to Du Bois, telling him that the French group would not be sending delegates. However, in one of the reports he published in The Crisis, Du Bois drew on words spoken by Ida Gibbs Hunt and Rayford Logan to imply that the French Committee had sent delegates. As long-time African-American residents of France, Hunt and Logan had traveled independently to the meeting, and Hunt and Béton were perturbed that Du Bois had implied they represented France. Black French people, including Béton and Gratien Candace who resigned from the congress, were worried the event would have "radical tendencies".

== 1927 New York City Congress (Fourth) ==
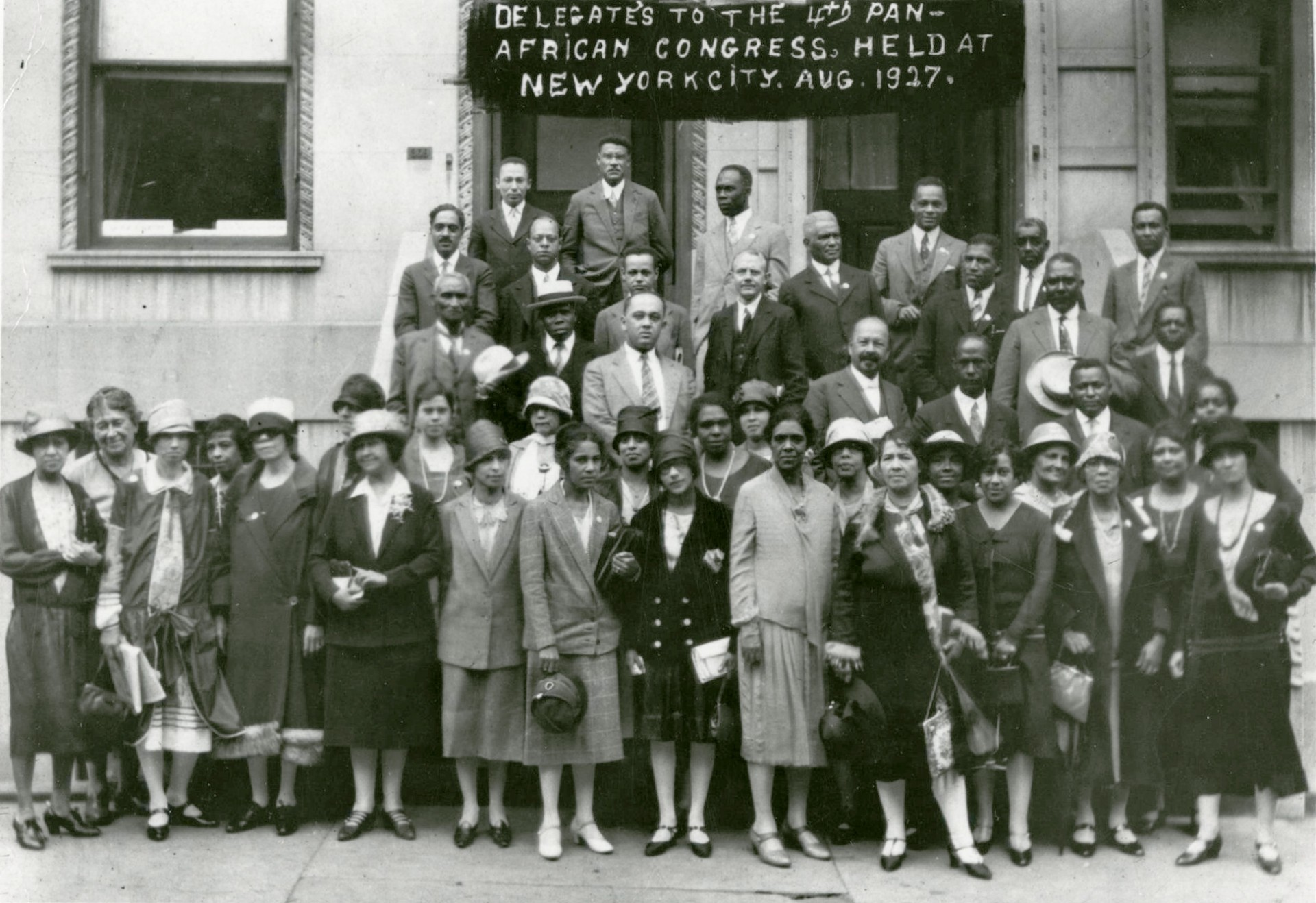
Delegates from Oregon for the Fourth Pan African Congress in New York, 1927.

=== Planning ===
According to Du Bois, an earlier plan to hold the Fourth Congress in the West Indies, specifically Port-au-Prince, in 1925 did not pan out due to transportation and other issues. Instead, the Congress was held in New York City in 1927.

Women played a significant role in this congress. Addie Whiteman Dickerson, Addie Hunton and the Women's International League for Peace and Freedom were key fundraisers for the meeting. The Circle for Peace and Foreign Relations of New York City was also one of the sponsors of the Fourth Pan-African Congress. Beatrice Morrow Cannady, Dora Cole Norman, Dorothy R. Peterson, and Jessie Redmon were all active in planning for the Fourth Congress. The Grace Congregational Church served as planning headquarters.

=== Event ===
The opening meeting was held at St. Mark's Methodist Church and the Headquarters remained at the Grace Congregational Church. There were about 208 delegates from the United States and other countries. Low attendance from British and French colonies was due to government travel restrictions.

William Pickens gave a speech on the importance of worker solidarity during the opening session. Other speakers at the opening session included Chief Nana Amoah, Reginald G. Barrow, Dantès Bellegarde, James Francis Jenkins, H. K. Rakhit, Adolph Sixto, and T. Augustus Toote. Later speeches were given by W. Tete Ansa, Helen Noble Curtis, Du Bois, Leo William Hansbury, Leslie Pinckney Hill, Georges Sylvain, and Charles H. Wesley. The final speeches of the congress were given by H. H. Philips, Rayford Logan, and Y. Hikada on politics in Africa.

Committees were formed during the event, including the creation of a resolution committee headed by Bellegarde, Cannady, Du Bois, Hunton, and Reverdy C. Ransom.

=== Outcomes ===
The Fourth Pan-African Congress was held in New York City adopted resolutions that were similar to the Third Pan-African Congress meetings. Resolutions called for the liberation of various colonized countries, including Haiti, China, and Egypt. A call for working class solidarity across racial lines was also included, but no plans for how to accomplish this were made.

=== Delegates ===
There were 208 delegates from the United States and 10 different foreign countries. Africa was represented by delegates from the Gold Coast, Liberia, Nigeria, and Sierra Leone.

- Dantès Bellegarde, Haiti.
- Anna J. Cooper.
- Amy Jacques Garvey.
- Rayford Logan.
- Richard B. Moore, American Negro Labor Congress.

== 1945 Manchester Congress (Fifth) ==
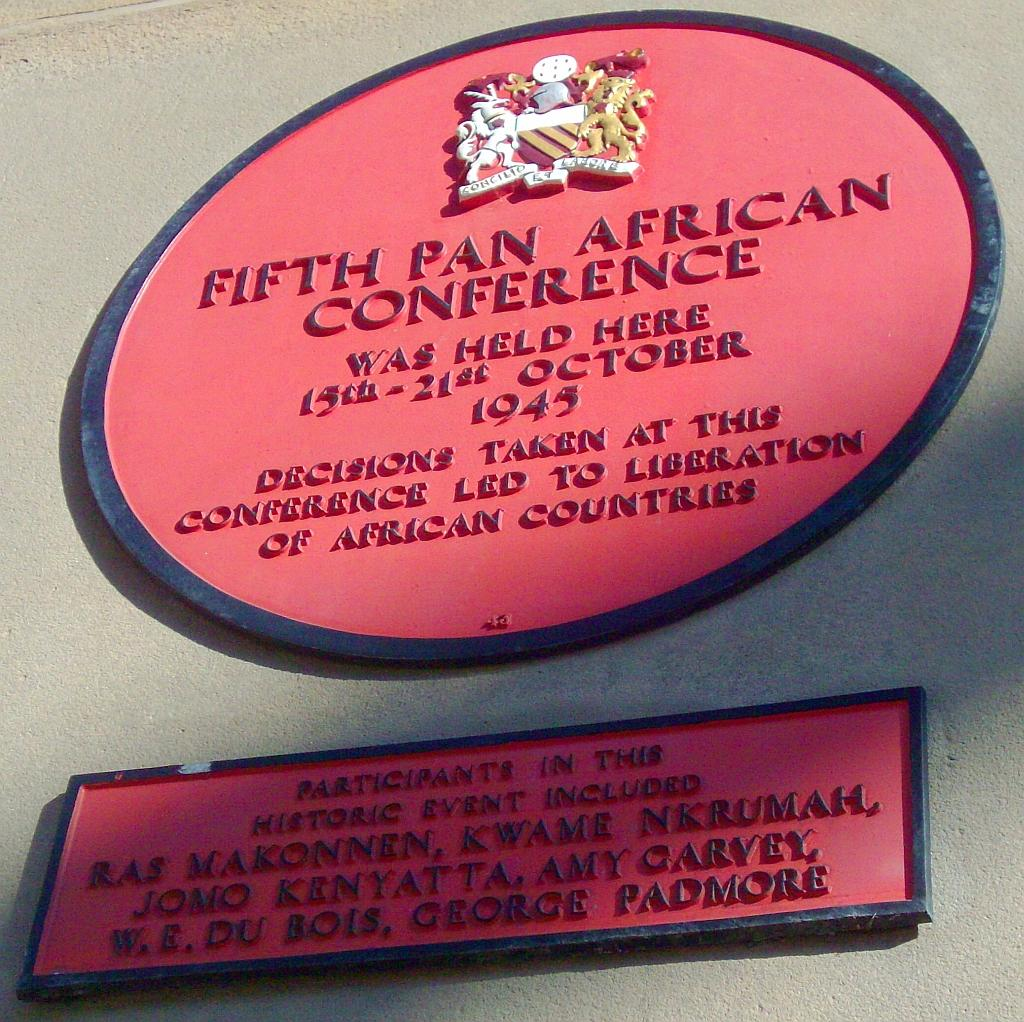
The commemorating plaque at Chorlton-on-Medlock Town Hall, Manchester.

Following the foundation of the Pan-African Federation (PAF) in Manchester in 1945, the Fifth Pan-African Congress was held at the Chorlton-on-Medlock Town Hall, Manchester, United Kingdom, between the 15 and 21 October 1945.

Although forming a part of a larger Pan-African movement at the beginning of the century, this event was organised by people in Manchester, and they brought in the people from all over the world." While the previous four congresses had involved predominantly members of the African diaspora, including those in the United Kingdom, Afro-Caribbeans and Afro-Americans." the fifth included more representatives from the African continent.

It was the wish of the West African Students' Union that the event be hosted in Liberia and not in Europe, however having originally been scheduled in Paris to coincide with the 1945 World Trade Union Conference, it was switched to August in Manchester. The Conference took place in a building decorated with the flags of the three black nations under self-governance at the time Ethiopia, and Liberia and the Republic of Haiti.

The Fifth Congress had a larger profile than the first four PACs. At the end of World War II, around 700 million people lived under imperial rule and were 'subject people', with no freedoms, no parliaments, no democracy, and no trade unions to protect workers. Many felt betrayed after being promised movement towards self-government if they fought for European colonial powers during the First World War – only to have such promises later denied so a new militancy had emerged with demands for decolonization as well as condemning imperialism, racial discrimination, and capitalism.

=== Planning ===
Planning began in 1944 after Du Bois corresponded with Amy Jacques Garvey and Harold Moody on an idea for an "African Freedom Charter". This correspondence led to Du Bois calling for a fifth Pan African Congress to be held in London. Du Bois was unaware that George Padmore had also called for a Pan African Congress to be held after WWII, but once he found out, he was interested in working with Padmore. Additional plans were made with the NAACP, and the congress was tentatively scheduled for Paris at the same time as the World Trade Union Conference. Plans changed again in August 1945, when Du Bois announced that the fifth PAC would be held in England, one week after the trade union conference.

=== Attendees ===
There was a much greater representation of African delegates and attendees from Continental Africa at this conference. Marika Sherwood notes that "There were also eleven listed 'fraternal delegates', from Cypriot, Somali, Indian and Ceylonese (Sri Lankan) organisations, as well as the Women's International League and two British political parties, the Common Wealth Party and Independent Labour Party". Historian Saheed Adejumobi writes in The Pan-African Congresses, 1900–1945 that "while previous Pan-African congresses had been controlled largely by black middle-class British and American intellectuals who had emphasized the amelioration of colonial conditions, the Manchester meeting was dominated by delegates from Africa and Africans working or studying in Britain." Adejumobi notes that "the new leadership attracted the support of workers, trade unionists, and a growing radical sector of the African student population. With fewer African American participants, delegates consisted mainly of an emerging crop of African intellectual and political leaders, who soon won fame, notoriety, and power in their various colonized countries." Among attendees were Hastings Banda, Kwame Nkrumah and Jomo Kenyatta who would go on to be the first presidents of their newly independent countries. Commentators estimate that 87–90 delegates were in attendance at the Congress, representing some 50 organisations, with a total of 200 audience members present. While Nnamdi Azikiwe did not attend the conference, he is on the record saying how important it was for the momentum of independence movement at the time.

Delegates Fifth Pan-African Congress include:

- Antigua:
  - Workers' Union – R. G. Small, W. R. Austin
- Bahamas:
  - R. Johnson, J. McCaskie, R. D. Watson, J. M. King
- Barbados:
  - Progressive League – E. de L. Yearwood
  - Workers' Union – A. Mosley
- Belize:
  - Workers' League – H. T. Weir, M. Dawson, Gilbert Cargill, Horace Dawson
- Bermuda:
  - Workers' Association: G. R. Tucker, E. Richards
- Gambia:
  - Gambia Labour Union – I. M. Garba-Jahumpa
  - National Council of Gambia – J. Downes-Thomas
- Ghana:
  - Aborigines' Rights Protection Society – Ashie Nikoi
  - Friends of African Freedom Society – Bankole Awoonor Renner, Mrs Renner
  - Gold Coast Farmers' Association – Ashie Nikoi, W. J. Kwesi Mould
  - Railway Workers' Union – J. S. Annan
- Great Britain:
  - African Progressive Association, London – Koi Larbi
  - African Students' Union of Edinburgh – J.C deGraft Johnson
  - Association of African Descent, Dublin – Jaja Wachuku
  - Coloured Worker' Association – Ernest P. Marke, E. A. Aki-Emi, James Nortey
  - International African Service Bureau – Peter Abrahams, Amy Ashwood Garvey, Kwame Nkrumah Ras T. Makonnen, George Padmore
  - League of African Peoples, Birmingham – Dr. Clarence J. Piliso
  - The Negro Association, Manchester – C. Peart, M. I. Faro, Frank Niles, Dr. P. Milliard, F. W. Blaine
  - The Negro Welfare Centre, Liverpool – E. E. Kwesi Kurankyi-Taylor, James Eggay Taylor, Edwin J. DuPlan, C. D. Hyde, E. Asuquo Cowan
  - The Young African Progressive League – Adeniran Ogunsanya, E. Brown, George Nelson, Raz Finni
  - United Committee of Coloured and Colonial People Association, Cardiff – Aaron Albert Mossell, J. S. Andrew, Jim Nurse, H. Hassan, Basil Roderick
  - West African Students' Union, London – Joe Appiah, F. O. B. Blaize, S. Ako Adjei, F. R. Kankam-Boadu
- Grenada:
  - Labour Party – S. J. Andrews
- Guyana:
  - African Development Association – W. Meighan, Dr. Peter Milliard
  - Trades Union Council – D. M. Harper
- Kenya:
  - Kikuyu Central Association – Jomo Kenyatta.
- Jamaica:
  - People's National Party – L. A. Thoywell-Henry
  - Trade Union Congress – Ken Hill
  - Universal Negro Improvement Association and African Communities League – Alma La Badie, L. A. Thoywell-Henry, V. G. Hamilton, K. Boxer
- Liberia:
  - Progressive Society – J. Tobie, Robert Broadhurst
- Malawi:
  - Nyasaland African Congress – Dr. Hastings Banda
- Nigeria:
  - Calabar Improvement League – Eyo B. Ndem
  - National Council of Nigeria and Cameroons – Magnus Williams, F. B. Joseph
  - Nigerian Youth Movement – Obafemi Awolowo, H. O. Davies
  - Trade Union Congress – A. Soyemi Coker
- Saint Kitts and Nevis:
  - St. Kitts Workers' League – R. Johnson
  - St. Kitts and Nevis Trades and Labour Union – J.A. Linton, Ernest McKenzie-Mavinga
- Saint Lucia:
  - Seamen's and Waterfront Workers' Union – J. M. King
- Sierra Leone:
  - Teachers' Union – Harry Sawyerr
  - The People's Forum – Lamina Sankoh
  - Trade Union Congress – I. T. A. Wallace Johnson
  - West African Youth League – I. T. A. Wallace-Johnson
- South Africa:
  - African National Congress – Peter Abrahams, Makumalo (Mako) Hlubi
  - Davidson Don Tengo Jabavu were supposed to attend however along with several of his fellow South African delegates could not due to issues obtaining passports.
- Tanzania:
  - S. Rahinda
- Trinidad and Tobago:
  - Federated Workers Trade Union – George Padmore
  - Labour Party – Ernest McKenzie-Mavinga
  - Negro Welfare and Cultural Association – C. Lynch
  - Oilfields Workers' Trade Union – John F. F. Rojas
  - Trade Union Congress – Rupert Gittens
  - West Indian National Party – Claude Lushington
- Uganda:
  - The Young Baganda – I. Yatu

Fraternal delegates, observers and other attendees include:

- Committee of Cyprus Affairs – L. Joannou
- Common Wealth – Miss Leeds
- Communist Party of Great Britain – Len Johnson, Wilf Charles, Pat Devine
- Federation of Indian Associations - Nagendranath Gangulee
- Federation of Indian Organisations in Britain - Surat Alley
- Independent Labour Party - John McNair
- Lanka Sama Samaja Party – Tikiri Banda Subasinghe
- National Association for the Advancement of Colored People – W. E. B. Du Bois
- Negro Welfare Association – Miss Levy, R. B. Rose, A. B. Blaine
- Somali Society – Ismail Dorbeh
- Women's International League – N. Burton

Other Attendees include: Raphael Armattoe, Kojo Botsio, Cecil Belfield Clarke and Dudley Thompson.

=== Issues addressed ===
Among the issues addressed at the conference were:

- "The Colour Problem in Britain", Including issues of unemployment among black youth; abandoned mixed-race children fathered by black ex-servicemen and white British mothers; racial discrimination, the colour bar and discriminatory employment practices. These topics were discussed at the first session of the Congress held on October 15, 1945, chaired by Amy Ashwood Garvey.
- "Imperialism in North and West Africa". All present demanded independence for African nations; delegates were split on the issue of having political emancipation first or control of the economy. Kwame Nkrumah advocated for revolutionary methods of seizing power as essential to Independence. From this session onwards the chair was taken by Dr W. E. B. Du Bois.
- "Oppression in South Africa". Including the social, economic, educational, health and employment inequalities faced by Black South Africans. All present expressed support and sympathy which included a number of demands outlined.
- "The East African Picture". Focusing on the issue of land, most of the best land had been occupied by White settlers; working conditions and wages for Africans reflected the same inequalities as South Africa. This session was open by Jomo Kenyatta.
- "Ethiopia and The Black Republics". Discussing the issue of Britain exercising control over Ethiopia although Emperor Haile Selassie had been restored to the throne; the United Nations not offering help to Ethiopia while Italy (which conquered Ethiopia in 1935 under a fascist regime) was receiving UN help.
- "The Problems in the Caribbean" This session was addressed by a number of trade union delegates from the Caribbean; some delegates demanded "complete independence", some "self-government" and others "dominion status".

=== Women's contributions ===
Women played an important role in the Fifth Congress. Amy Ashwood Garvey chaired the opening session and Alma La Badie, a Jamaican member of the Universal Negro Improvement Association, spoke about child welfare. Women also supported in behind-the-scenes roles, organising many of the social and other events outside the main sessions. Historians Marika Sherwood and Hakim Adi have specifically written about women involved in the Fifth-Congress.

=== Reception ===
The British press scarcely mentioned the conference. However, Picture Post covered the Fifth Pan-African Congress in an article by war reporter Hilde Marchant titled "Africa Speaks in Manchester", published on 10 November 1945. Picture Post was also responsible for sending John Deakin to photograph the event.

=== Outcomes ===
This conference shifted the discussion about Pan-Africanism to focus more on African leaders and the people of Africa as "primary agents of change in the anti-colonial and anti-imperial struggles." Du Bois attempted to enlist the NAACP into further support for Pan-Africanism and aid to Africa, but the results were tepid. Du Bois continued to work towards the creation of a Pan-African movement in the United States throughout 1946. Due to the Red Scare, the NAACP stepped back from its support of Pan Africanism.

=== Commemoration ===
- Red Commemorative plaque. It is suggested by commentators that Manchester community leader and political activist, Kath Locke, persuaded Manchester City Council to place a red plaque commemorating the Congress on the wall of Chorlton Town Hall.
- Black Chronicles III: The Fifth Pan African Congress. Autograph ABP hosted the first exhibition showcasing John Deakin's photographs from the Fifth Congress. The exhibition marked the 70th anniversary of the Congress in 2015 and included film screenings exploring Pan-African history and ideals curated by June Givanni.
- "Pan African Congress 50 years on". The project interviewed attendees of the 1945 Pan African Congress who were still living in Manchester in 1995. The project was part of the 50th commemorative event held in Manchester in 1995.
- "PAC@75". Manchester Metropolitan University held a four-day celebration in October 2020 to mark the 75th anniversary of the Fifth Pan-African Congress. Curated by Professor of Architecture Ola Uduku, the anniversary celebrations involved both creative and academic events.
- Archive material relating to the 1945 and the subsequent celebratory events in 1982 and 1995 are held at the Ahmed Iqbal Ullah Race Relations Resource Centre at Manchester Central Library. Len Johnson's papers at the Working Class Movement Library has records and documents from the 1945 Congress.

== 1974 Dar es Salaam Congress (Sixth) ==
The Sixth Pan-African Congress, also known as "Sixth-PAC or 6PAC", was hosted in Dar es Salaam, Tanzania, in June 1974. This was the first time the event took place in Africa. The event was originally proposed by Pauulu Kamarakafego to challenge neocolonialism and apartheid.

=== Planning ===
Activists involved in the Washington, D.C. Student Nonviolent Coordinating Committee (SNCC) and the Tanganyika African National Union (TANU) were involved in organizing and hosting the congress. Charlie Cobb, Courtland Cox, and James Garrett, who were involved with the SNCC, helped plan the event. C. L. R. James played a role influencing the congress. Other key organizers included Geri Stark Augusto, Judy Claude, Julian Ellison, Kathy Flewellen, Sylvia I. B. Hill, Loretta Hobbs, and James Turner. Flewellen and Hill, who served on the international secretariat, conducted meetings to select delegates for 6PAC. Hill organized the North American delegates, focusing on ways that the Black community could work together to pool resources to aid in the Pan-African movement. David L. Horne organized delegates from southern California.

James travelled to Tanzania to talk to Cox and Mwalimu Nyerere about hosting the congress there. During the planning, the radical non-governmental delegation from the Caribbean, which included members of the Afro-Caribbean Liberation movement, the New Jewel Movement, and the African Society for Cultural Relations with Independent Africa (ASCRIA), chose not to attend 6PAC. In solidarity, James also boycotted the congress despite "appeals from Julius Nyerere to attend."

Augusto and Edie Wilson moved to Dar es Salaam in 1973 where they served as the head of the International Secretariat for 6PAC. Planners had to decided whether 6PAC would pick up right where the 5th congress left off, which meant recommitting to opposing various forms of colonialism still present in Africa. Focusing on colonialism and imperialism was an important decision because it was possible that it could alienate Caribbean governments and delegates from the United States.

=== Event ===
Hundreds to thousands of participants met at the University of Dar es Salaam from 19 to 27 June 1974. Around 50 different sovereign governments and political organizations sent delegates to 6PAC. Delegates from liberation movements from several colonized countries also attended.

Hill served as the secretary general for North America. It was part of the original planning that groups working towards liberation have time to network and "build international solidarity". Activists such as Mae Mallory, Queen Mother Moore, Brenda Paris, and Florence Tate all attended 6PAC. For Black British activists Zainab Abbas, Gerlin Bean, Ron Phillips, and Ansel Wong, attending the conference allowed them to express the solidarity of the Black activists in Britain with anti-colonialists activists in the rest of the world. A highlight of the conference was the resolution on Palestine, which was the congress' formal recognition of the right of the Palestinian people to self-determination.

The opening address was given by Tanzanian President Julius Nyerere. His speech focused on promoting "nonracialism" at the congress because it is more important for all people to work together to free themselves from oppression in Africa.

Event planners also hoped that the Congress would support the creation of a Pan African Center of Science and Technology. Several men associated with Howard University, Neville Parker, Don Coleman, and Fletcher Robinson, all worked towards the development of a Pan African Center of Science and Technology during the congress. However, there was not enough support for the plan and it didn't make the final resolution.

=== Reception ===
The Los Angeles Times reported that the Congress was very divided and often too "militant".

=== Outcomes ===
A General Political Statement was created at 6PAC which called for an end to all forms of colonialism, including neocolonialism. The statement also called for a unification of African people to work towards socialism throughout Africa to end oppression. It explicitly called out all kinds of racism and nationalism.

Augusto stayed in Dar es Salaam after 6PAC to edit the proceedings of the event for the Tanzania Publishing House.

Several North American activists from the 6PAC went on to Washington, D.C., in the fall of 1974 to lobby the United States to take action against apartheid in South Africa. Under Hill's leadership, this grew into the Southern Africa News Collective, and eventually in 1978 turned into the Southern Africa Support Project (SASP).

=== Attendees ===
- Anna J. Cooper
- Amy Jacques Garvey

== 1994 Kampala Congress (Seventh) ==
The seventh Pan-African Congress was held in Kampala, Uganda from April 3 to April 8, 1994. The theme of the event was "Facing the Future in Unity, Social Progress and Democracy."

=== Planning ===
The seventh Pan African Congress was called by the Pan-African Movement of Nigeria who hoped to hold the event in Lagos. This group, however, wanted to limit attendance only to "African people", not Arab or white Africans.

=== Event ===
There were more than 2,000 participants at the event, which included a Women's Pre-Congress meeting. Ugandan president Yoweri Museveni spoke at the opening of the congress, where he listed five criteria for defining who is an "African". The criteria, which included people of many backgrounds and nationalities, helped define "African" as something that was not just a racial category. In addition, 7PAC brought together activists from different generations to work on modern problems together. Modern issues included HIV/AIDS in Africa, women's rights, and globalization. Other tensions to unravel in 7PAC and going forward include Black nationalism, Black Marxism–Leninism and the historical baggage that surrounds both ideas.

=== Delegates ===
- Ronald Muwenda Mutabi, Kabaka of Buganda.

== 2014 Johannesburg Congress and 2015 Accra Congress (Eighth) ==
=== 2014 Johannesburg Congress ===
The eighth Pan-African Congress was held at the University of the Witwatersrand from January 14th to January 16, 2014, in Johannesburg, South Africa. The theme of the eighth Congress was "Mobilizing Global Africans, for Renaissance and Unity: The Social and Economic Conditions of Global Afro-Descendants". Major discussions of the congress included African trade-unionism, the oppression of Black Africans in the "Arab world", and the promotion of African capitalism and entrepreneurship.

==== Outcomes ====
The Johannesburg Congress put forward several notable resolutions. It called for the creation of a Council for African National Affairs to organize and promote the rights of African migrant workers and foster Pan-Africanism. The Congress called for the global recognition of an African right to return, solidarity with the whole of the African diaspora, and the establishment of a National Reparations Commission in all countries where people of African descent exist.

==== Controversy ====
The eighth Congress saw a political split among Pan-Africanists, with the Johannesburg Congress excluding North African Arab countries due to centuries of the Arab slave trade and "in all Arab countries where Africans were a minority, they faced racist discrimination and Arabisation." This brought the organizers of the eighth Congress into conflict with those who aligned with the organizers of the seventh Congress, who viewed the exclusion of North Africa as a violation of the basic principles of Pan-Africanism and the conclusions of the sixth and seventh Congresses. The Johannesburg Congress defended its decision as emphasizing "Africanism" over "Continentalism", viewing Arabs on the African continent as apart from the African identity and Pan-Arabism as contradictory to Pan-Africanism. The Johannesburg Congress was also criticized for being organized by a small elite group, rather than being a grassroots effort. These criticisms have led some Pan-Africanist organizations to consider the Johannesburg congress "nullified".

=== 2015 Accra Congress ===
A rival eighth Congress was organized, hosted in 2015 in Accra, Ghana from March 5th to March 7, 2015. The theme of this Congress was “The Pan-African World We Want: Building a people's movement for just, accountable and inclusive structural transformation.” Major discussions included combating neoliberalism, sustainability and self-sufficient development, the emancipation of African women, anti-imperialism, the role of art and media in promoting Pan-Africanism, holding African leaders accountable to Pan-African principles, and the role of youth in the Pan-Africanist Movement.

==== Outcomes ====
The Accra Congress called for global solidarity with the Black Lives Matter movement in the United States, and proposed the founding of a global "African Lives Matter" campaign to run in parallel with it. It condemned the NATO-led invasion of Libya and subsequent execution of Muammar Gaddafi (a sponsor of past Congresses), calling for the formation of an African Union brigade to act as an independent stabilizing military force for areas "previously destabilized by Western interests". It condemned neoliberalism and reiterated a call for greater economic cooperation between African states and the creation of a unified African currency. It called for the removal of all US military bases from African soil. It resolved to concretize and unify the "6th Region of Africa": the African Diaspora.

The Accra Congress additionally resolved to organize a "permanent post-congress structure" in order to achieve the goals set by the Congress. The Congress concluded that Congresses held at irregular intervals had a negative effect on the Pan-African Movement and proposed a two-phase model for organizing future congresses beginning with an "eighth Pan-African Congress Phase II" to be held in May 2016 in Kampala, Uganda. This date was later postponed to no later than August 2017.

== 2025 Lomé Congress (Ninth) ==
The ninth Pan-African Congress was held in Lomé, Togo from December 8th to December 12, 2025 at the Palais des congrès de Lomé. North African states and all nations hosting communities of African descent were once again included in the event. The theme of the ninth congress was "The renewal of Pan-Africanism and Africa's role in the reform of multilateral institutions: mobilising resources and reinventing ourselves to take action". Major topics discussed included the meaning of Pan-Africanism in the 21st century, the fight for reparations, reforming institutions and developing international alliances, decolonization of the mind and culture, African self-sufficiency and development, and the role of feminism in Pan-Africanism.

=== Outcomes ===
Six major decisions were made by the end of the Congress. The government of the Togolese Republic was entrusted with following-up on implementation of commitments and decisions made at the congress in collaboration with the African Union Commission, states in Africa and of the African diaspora, and various diaspora institutions. Additionally, a committee will be established to monitor the implementation of decisions of the Congress.

The Congress called for the establishment of a Pan-African Day of Remembrance for deportees and victims of slavery and colonization. The Congress invited the collaboration of the African Union, CARICOM, CELAC, and diaspora organizations in selecting an appropriate annual date.

The Congress called on the Togolese Republic to draft a resolution to the United Nations General Assembly on establishing an International Day of Reparations and Restitutions.

The Congress called for the establishment of a permanent office for the Pan-African Congress, which from 2025-onwards will organize a Pan-African Congress every five years in collaboration with a selected host country.

The Congress submitted its final declaration to the Assembly of Heads of State and Government of the African Union for consideration and implementation.

== See also ==
- First Pan-African Conference
- Pan-Africanism
