= Edmund Fitzgerald (disambiguation) =

SS Edmund Fitzgerald was an American freighter that sank in Lake Superior in 1975.

Edmund Fitzgerald may also refer to:

- Edmund Fitzgerald Fredericks (1874 or 1875–1935), Guyanese lawyer and Pan-African activist
- Edmund B. Fitzgerald (1926–2013), American businessman
- The Edmund Fitzgerald (band), a British math rock group
- "The Wreck of the Edmund Fitzgerald", a 1976 song by Gordon Lightfoot
