= Léopold Bissol =

Léopold Bissol (born Le Robert, 8 October 1889 in Martinique; died 18 September 1982 in Fort-de-France) was a politician from Martinique, who served in the French National Assembly from 1945 to 1958. A trade unionist, he was initially a socialist but after breaking with Joseph Lagrosillière in 1919 and inspired by the founding of the Soviet Union, became a member of the French Communist Party. During the Second World War he helped to depose the Vichy French High Commissioner Georges Robert and was elected to local government positions. He was elected to the National Constituent Assembly in 1945 and remained a member of that body and its successor, the National Assembly, until his retirement in 1958.

== Biography ==
Bissol was born in Le Robert on Martinique on 8 October 1889. He became a cabinetmaker and was an active trade unionist, organising workers in agricultural, construction, metalworking, dockyard and electrical fields. He was close to Joseph Lagrosillière but saw his 1919 alliance with Fernand Clerc to seek election to the legislature of Martinique as a betrayal of his socialist values and cut ties.

Bissol was inspired by the Soviet Union and travelled the island with André Aliker to spread communist ideas. They were unsuccessful electorally until Bissol won a seat in elections to the canton of Fort-de-France in 1937. Bissol spoke out against Admiral Georges Robert the Vichy France High Commissioner in the Western Atlantic and helped prompt the June 1943 demonstrations that led to the overthrow of Robert. As the war in Europe ended, in May 1945, Bissol was elected to the municipal council of Fort-de-France on the French Communist Party list. On 7 October he was one of 14 communists elected to the General Council of Martinique.

On 21 October 1945 Bissol was elected to the National Constituent Assembly as the communist member for Martinique. Bissol was among the leaders in the campaign to convert Martiniqye from a colony to an overseas department of France, which was achieved on 19 March 1946. He was re-elected to the second assembly on 2 June 1946. On 10 November 1946 Bissol was elected to the first National Assembly of the French Fourth Republic, again representing Martinique for the communist party. He was re-elected to the same position on 17 June 1951. He remained active in local politics, in 1953 he was elected to the municipal council of Rivière-Pilote and in 1955 to the general council of Vauclin. In the 2 January 1956 French legislative election Bissol was again elected member of the National Assembly for Martinique.

Bissol became leader of the Martinique federation of the French Communist Party in October 1956, following the resignation of Aimé Césaire. The following september he helped to convert the federation into the Martinican Communist Party and later became its honorary president. Bissol did not contest the 1958 French legislative election, the communist candidate for Martinique was Georges Gratiant who unsuccessful.

Bissol died in Fort-de-France, Martinique, on 18 September 1982. On 20 January 2015 the high school in Petit-Manoir, Le Lamentin, which specialises in teaching construction trades, was named after Bissol.
