= Guilbaud =

Guilbaud is a French surname. Notable people with the surname include:

- Maëlle Guilbaud (born 1996), French windsurfer
- Marie-Pierre Guilbaud (born 1963), French cross country skier
- Patrick Guilbaud, French chef
- René Guilbaud (1890–1928), French military aviator
- Tertullien Guilbaud (1856-1937), Haitian lawyer, diplomat and poet
