= Hutto (surname) =

Hutto is a surname of unknown origin, introduced into the United States in the 18th century. Isaac Hutto was the first Hutto to enter the United States from France. The name is most commonly found in the southern United States.

In 1962 Edgar Hutto published a 47-page book describing Isaac Hutto's journey to America, entitled Isaac (Otto) Hutto from the German Rhine to the Edisto in Carolina.

Genealogical research by Joel Hutto published in 2024 found that Isaac Hutto, Sr. (Isaac Haudot) was born into a French Calvinist Protestant family prior to emigrating to Charleston, South Carolina, US via Germany.

Famous people with the surname Hutto include:

- Benjamin Hutto (1947–2015), president of the Royal School of Church Music
- C. Bradley Hutto (born 1957), member of the South Carolina Senate
- David Hutto (born 1977), American rapper who performs under the moniker Boondox.
- Earl Hutto (1926–2020), U.S. Representative from Florida
- George Rubin Hutto (1870-1922), American educator
- J. B. Hutto (1926–1983), American blues musician
- James Emory Hutto (1824–1914), founder of Hutto, Williamson County, Texas

Hutto can also refer to the T. Don Hutto Residential Center, used to detain immigrants, located near Hutto, Texas.
