= Adolph Sixto =

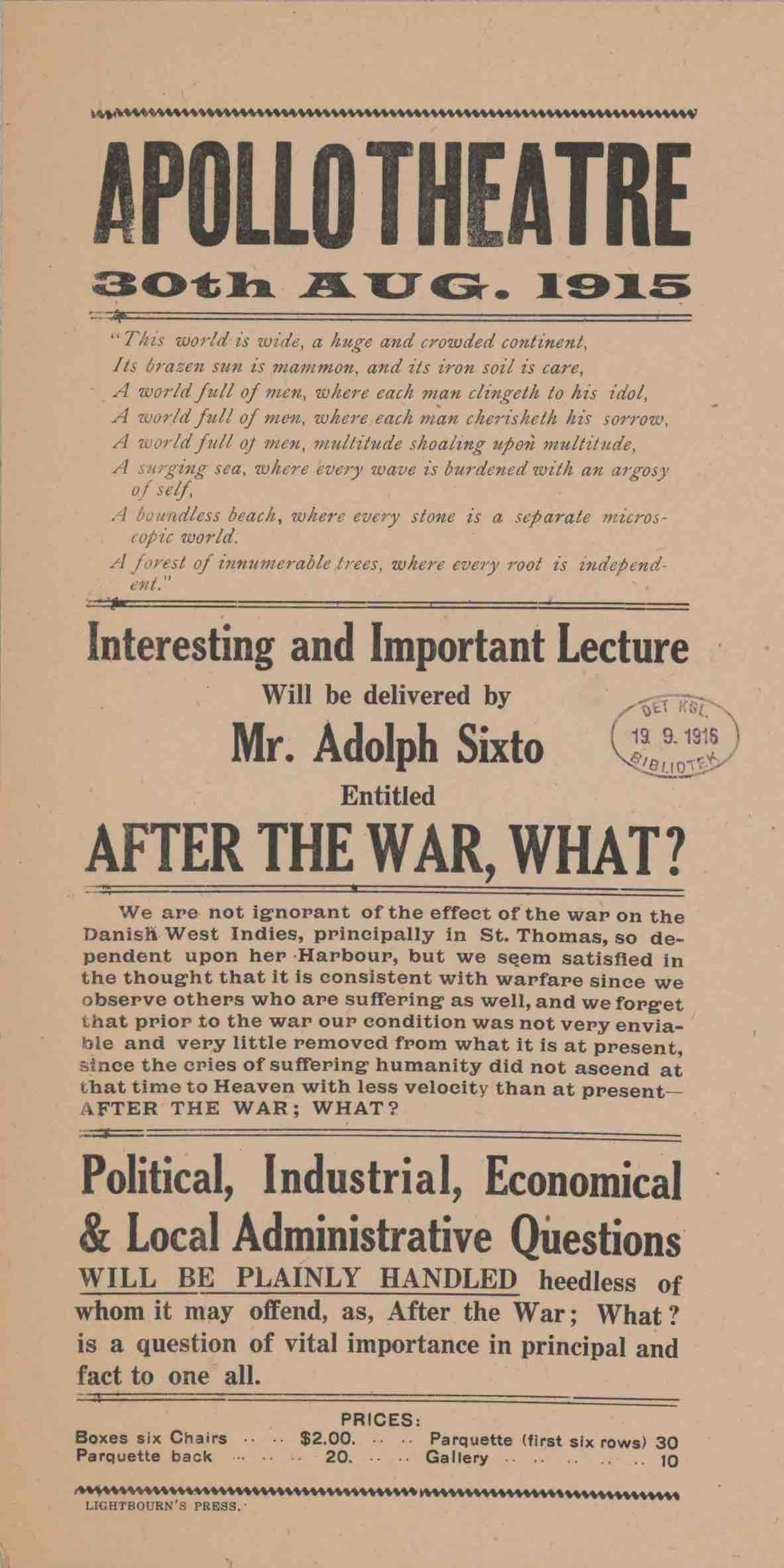
Apollo Theater Bill featuring Adolph Sixto on August 30, 1915, "After the War, What?"

Adolph Francisco Sixto (February 27, 1859 – July 5, 1930) was a writer, lecturer, lobbyist and amateur naturalist from St. Thomas.

Sixto gave a lecture about the Danish West Indies for members of St. Philip's Lyceum in New York City in October in 1916. He attended the Fourth Pan-African Congress in New York in 1927. Sixto was part of a delegation to the US in order to ask that the ban on alcohol sales be lifted for the Virgin Islands.

Sixto died on July 5, 1930.
