= Addie E. Dillard =

American educator

Addie E. Dillard Hutto was an American educator. She was involved in several of the Pan African Congresses and was a member of Women's Clubs. She served as principal of Hutto School in Bainbridge, Georgia, for 52 years.

Dillard graduated from Benedict College. On July 19, 1892, she married George Rubin Hutto and the couple had two sons together. After George Hutto died in 1922, Dillard took over as the principal of the Bainbridge Colored Grade School. After she took over, she improved the school significantly through grant funding and eventually it became Hutto School. Dillard worked for the school for 52 years, retiring in 1942.

Dillard was a delegate to the Second Pan African Congress and also served on the committee to plan the Fourth Pan African Congress in 1927. Dillard was also involved in the Women's Baptist Convention, serving as recording secretary. She served as treasurer for the Georgia State Federation of Colored Women's Clubs. In 1943, Dillard was the first woman to be honored by the Fort Valley College as a distinguished "Negro educator" in Georgia.
