= Gratien Candace =

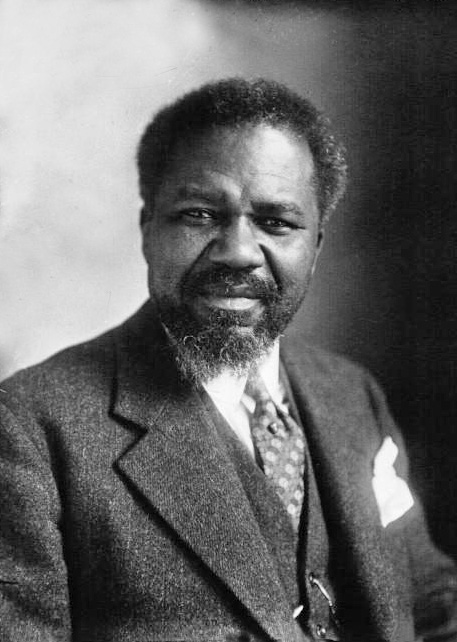
Gratien Candace, deputy of Guadeloupe (1929)

Gratien Candace (18 December 1873 in Baillif, Guadeloupe, France – 11 April 1953 in Lormaye, France) was a politician from Guadeloupe who served in the French Chamber of Deputies from 1912 to 1942 and served as vice-president of the French Chamber of Deputies from 1938 to 1940. On 10 July 1940, Candace voted in favour of granting the cabinet presided by Marchal Philippe Pétain authority to draw up a new constitution, thereby effectively ending the French Third Republic and establishing Vichy France. He retired from French politics in 1940, declining to become part of the Vichy regime. However, in 1941 he was made a member of the National Council of Vichy France.

Candace attended the First Pan-African Congress in Paris on 19–22 February 1919.

African-American historian and Pan-Africanist W. E. B. Du Bois faulted Candace harshly for a perceived lack of commitment to the interests of the African diaspora, writing "Candace is virulently French. He has no conception of Negro uplift, as apart from French development."

He earned a degree in science at the University of Toulouse and later taught as a professor and was a founder of the École nationale de la France d'Outre-Mer (ENFOM) and the Académie des Sciences Coloniales.

== Image gallery ==
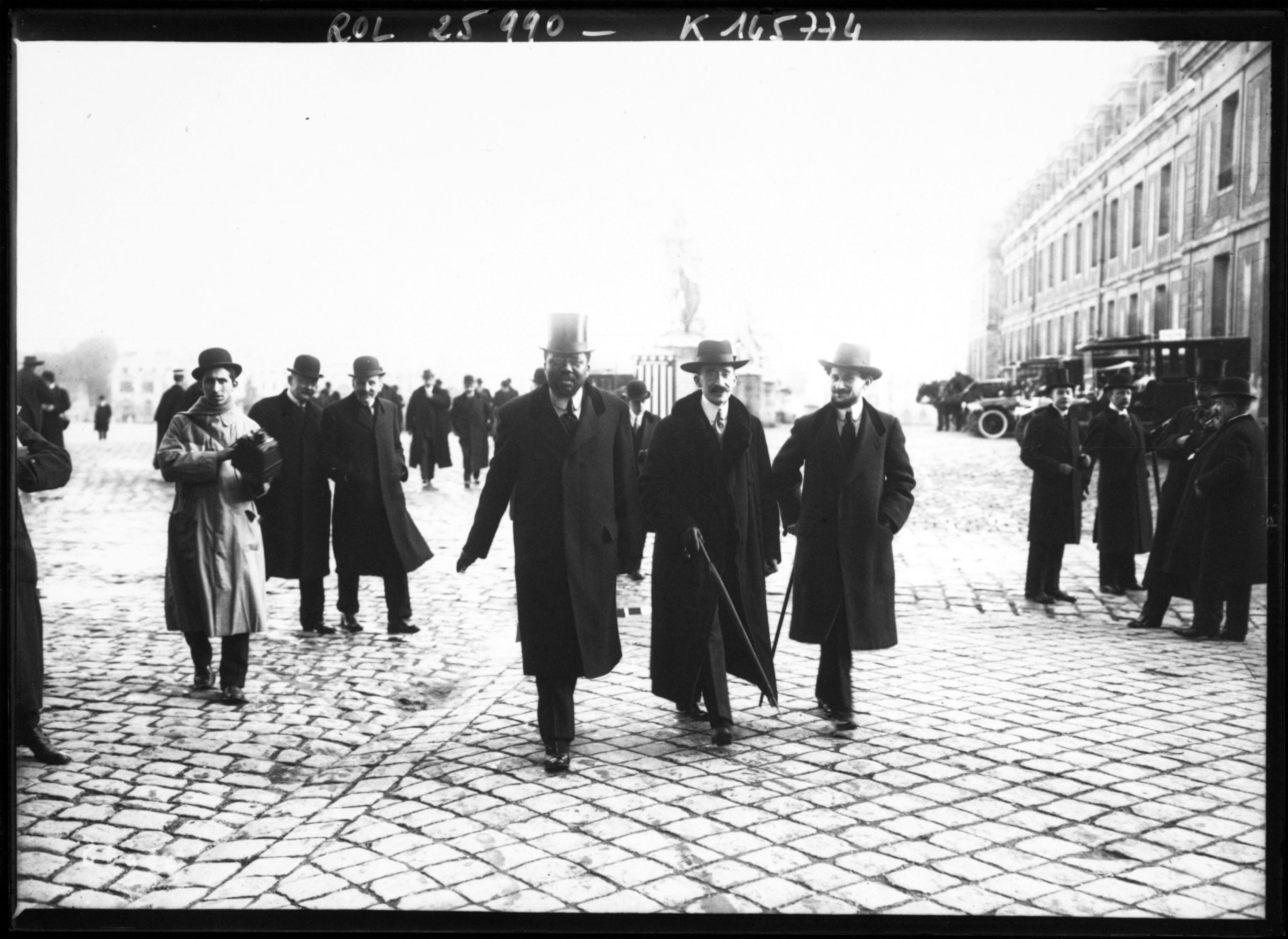
1913, Versailles, presidential election

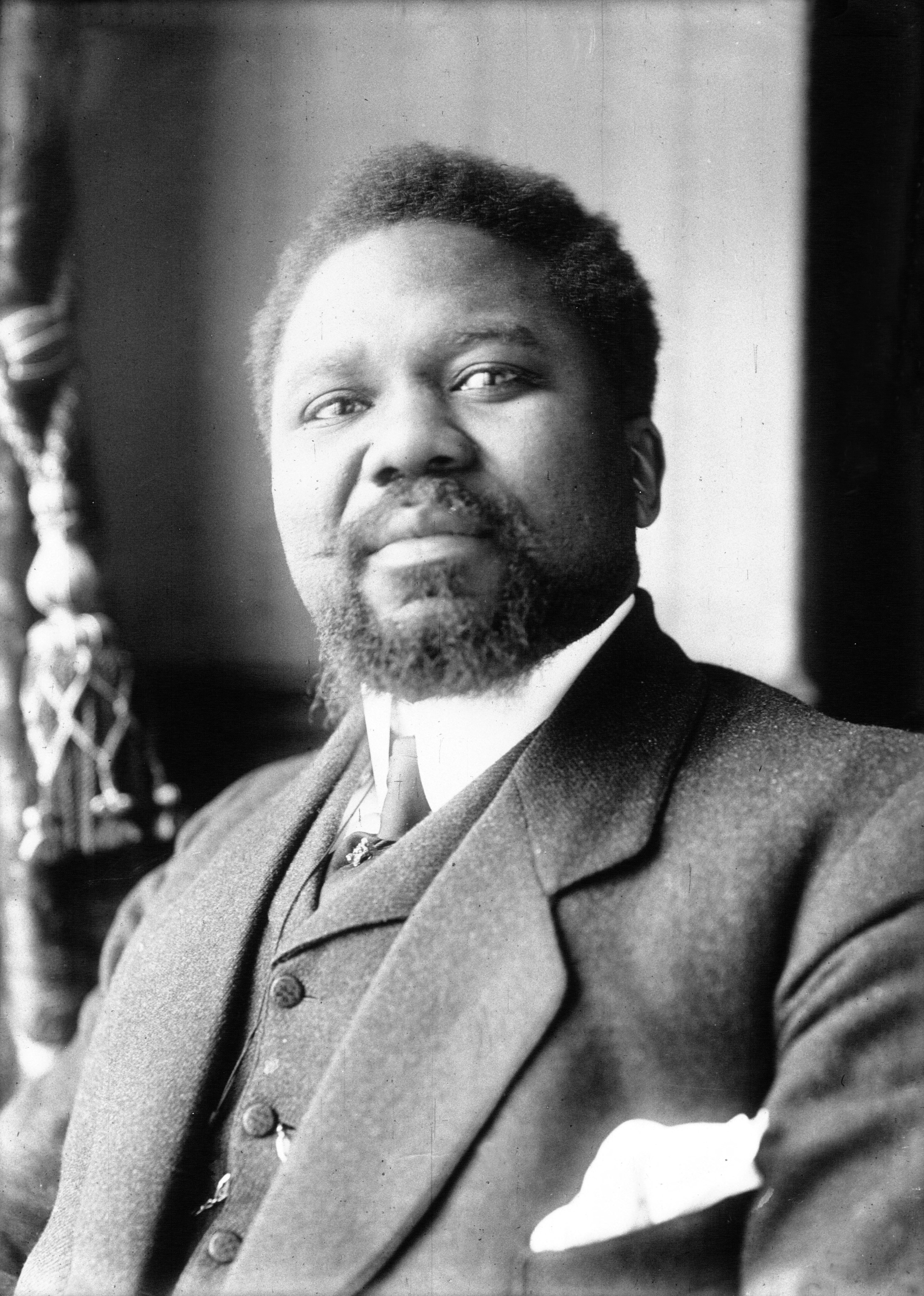
1914, Gratien Candace at his desk at the Chamber of Deputies

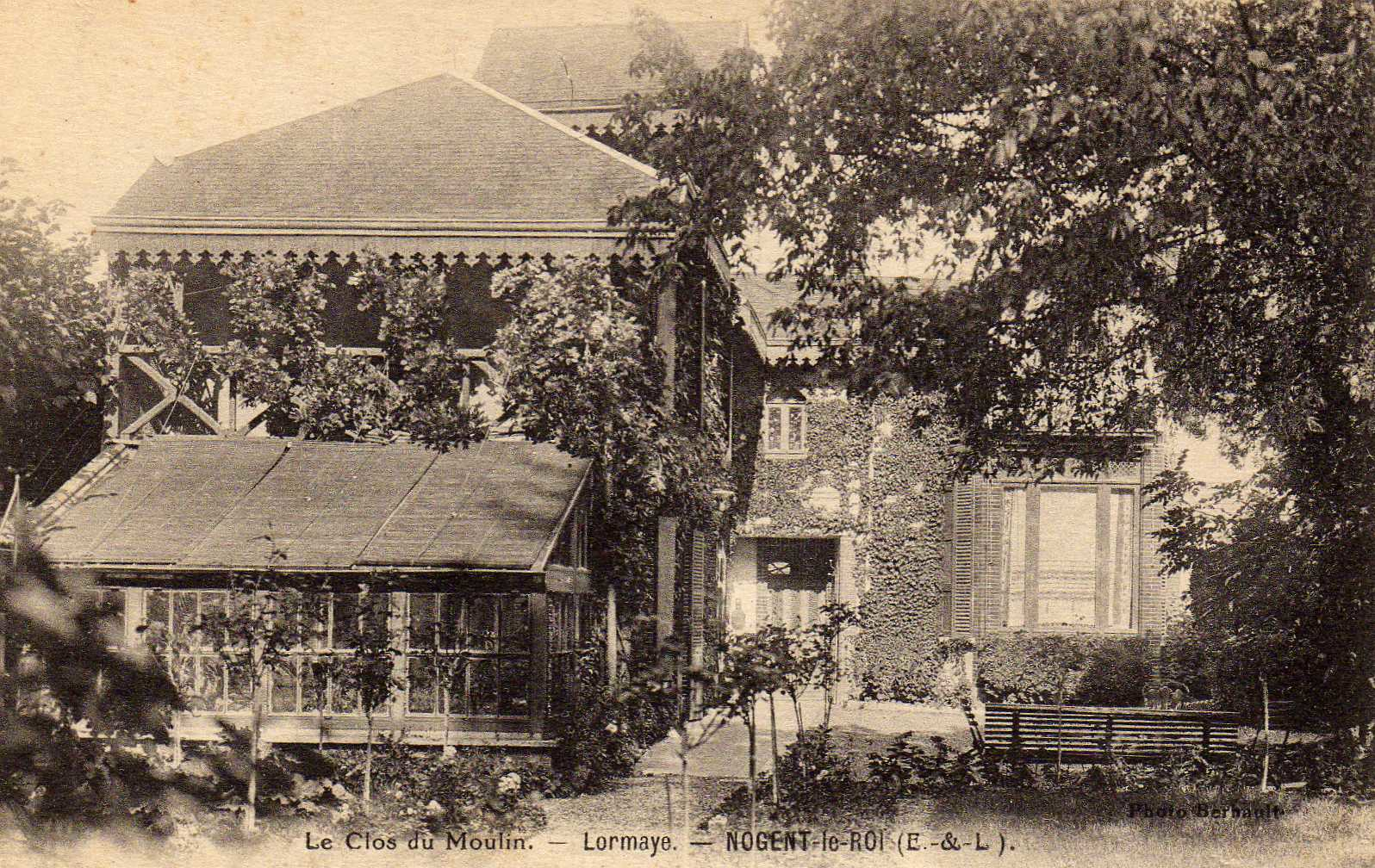
Le Clos du Moulin, Candace's house at Lormaye

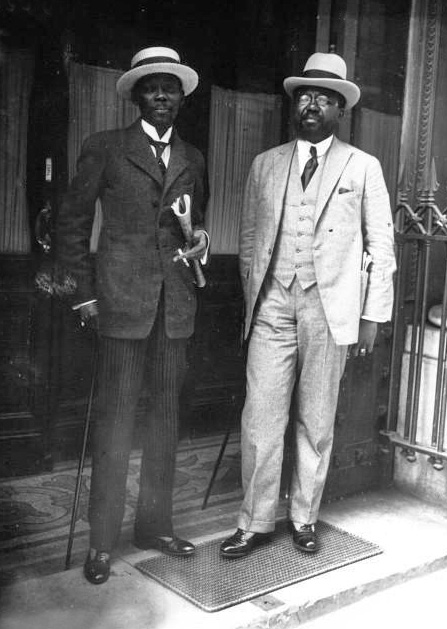
1921, Blaise Diagne et Gratien Candace

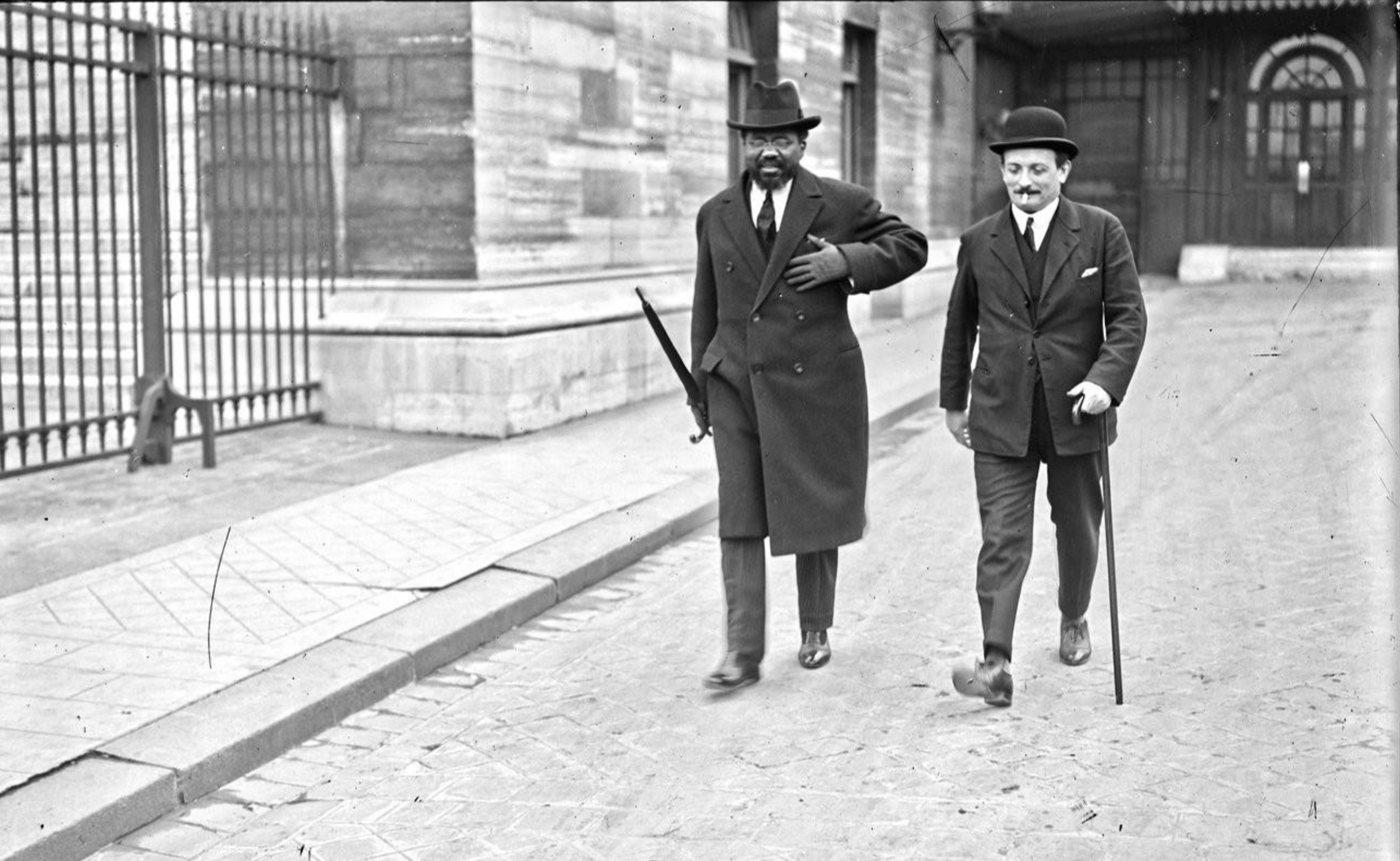
Charles Daniélou and Gratien Candace, 11 April 1925

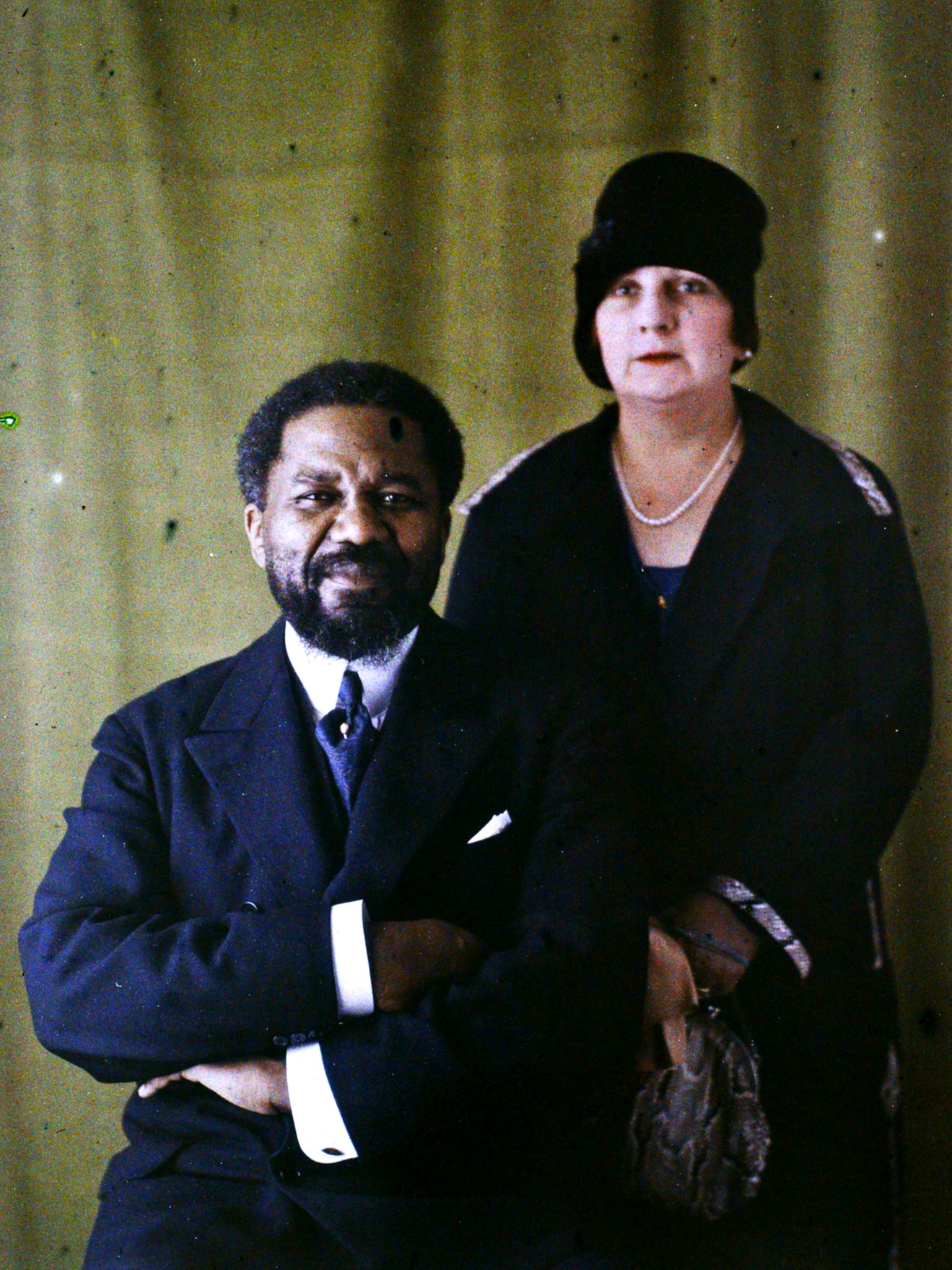
1927 Autochrome of Gratien Candace with his wife Jeanne, by Auguste Léon
