= Helen Noble Curtis =

American activist, service worker, educator and speaker (1874–1961)

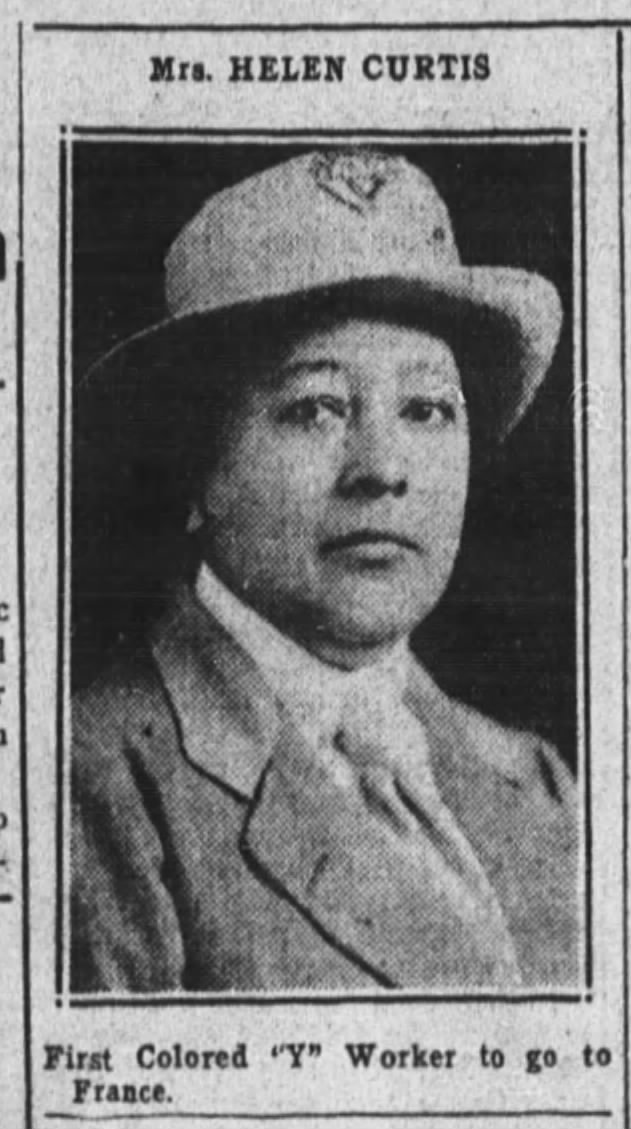
- Born: October 10, 1874; New Orleans, Louisiana, U.S.
- Died: December 2, 1961 (aged 87); New York City, New York, U.S.
- Education: Southern University at New Orleans
- Occupations: Activist, educator, missionary, service worker
- Years active: 1909–1961
- Known for: First Black female YMCA delegate in France during WWI, anti-lynching activism
- Movement: Pan-Africanism; Anti-lynching movement Women's suffrage
- Awards: National Council of Negro Women Outstanding Woman of the Year (1948)

Helen Noble Curtis (1874–1961) was an American activist, service worker, educator, and speaker. Curtis was the first Black YMCA delegate to go to France during World War I. She fought racism and issues facing women while she was in service during the war. After the war, she was a delegate to several Pan-African Congresses, one time acting as the delegate for Liberia. Curtis spent many years in Liberia as a missionary for the African Methodist Episcopal Church. During her time there, she worked to improve the conditions of residents of Monrovia. Curtis took part in the anti-lynching movement. She continued to volunteer in various capacities into her eighties.

== Biography ==
Helen Noble Curtis was born in New Orleans on October 10, 1874. She graduated from Southern University at New Orleans in 1900, and during her time at the school, spent a year or more in Paris, France, where she learned to make dresses and corsets. She went on to teach dressmaking at the YWCA in 1909. In 1912, she started a Camp Fire Girls club.

In 1915, Curtis's husband, James L. Curtis, was appointed the minister resident and consul general to Liberia. A 1916 letter from Helen Curtis describing her travels with her husband in Monrovia was published by The New York Age. On October 24, 1917, her husband died after a medical operation in Freetown, Sierra Leone. After his death, due to wartime shortages, it was difficult to bring his body home in a coffin. Eventually his body was returned home by the Swedish government using a metal rum barrel instead of a coffin, and services were held in Chicago.

During World War I, Curtis worked at Camp Upton, where she was the first woman to work the canteen there. In May 1918, she went to France as a representative of the YMCA. Curtis, who was fluent in French, was the first to arrive in France, landing on December 31. Her work there was successful and she was joined later by Addie W. Hunton. Curtis and Hunton, who were also joined by Kathyrn M. Johnson, worked in the segregated areas that served the Black soldiers. During the war, many Black soldiers faced discrimination from the American Expeditionary Forces (AEF) and Curtis worked to fight against racism. She wrote about the sacrifices and bravery of the Black soldiers fighting in France and also related "firsthand accounts of black women's sacrifices, perseverance, and protests." When a brothel was set up at one of the Black camps, she fought against the endorsed prostitution, even through it angered her white supervisors. Her complaints caused the camp commander to notify Military Intelligence Division (MID) that she was "guilty of negro-subversion." After around six months of spurious investigations, it was finally ended by E. C. Carter, the top YMCA official in Paris, who exonerated Curtis. After the investigation, Curtis continued to work in the canteen, supporting and teaching soldiers.

After the war, she was chosen by Jane Addams to be a delegate to the League of Peace and Freedom. As a delegate, she gave a speech called "The Use of African Troops in Europe," which described the racism soldiers faced in many situations, including at hospitals. Her speech brought a needed perspective of the discrimination faced by Black people as they were fighting and volunteering for their country during the war. In February 1919, Curtis was one of a few women to take part in the Pan-African Congress. After the congress, Curtis worked and traveled through France, Italy, and Spain with Mary B. Talbert, networking and spreading information about Black women and their work. Curtis translated Talbert's writing and speeches into French in order to reach as many Black women as possible around the world.

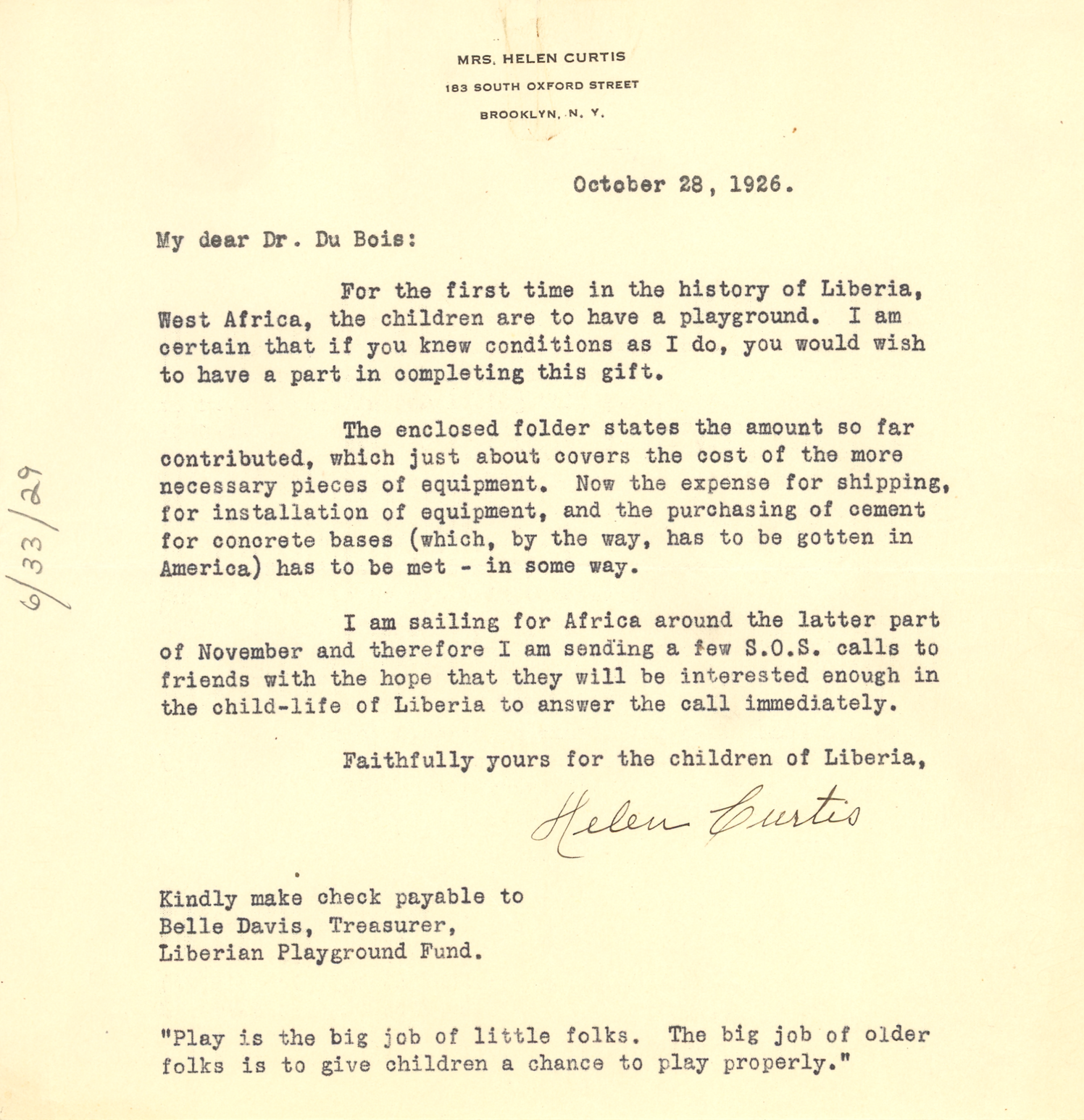
Letter from Helen Curtis to W.E.B. Du Bois, October 28, 1926.png

Curtis returned to the United States in August 1919. She talked about her wartime experiences, always emphasizing the bravery of Black soldiers and the hard work that African Americans did during the war. In this way, she was able to help combat racist propaganda. Later that year, she was one of the hosts for the wife of Liberian president-elect Charles D. B. King, Cecelia Adelaide Cooper King, upon their visit to the U.S. During the Second Pan-African Congress, Curtis "acted as the sole representative of the country of Liberia." In 1921 she was honored in Washington, D.C. as part of an Armistice Day Celebration sponsored by the Over-Seas Women of the YMCA. Earlier that year, she was part of a protest at the Capitol Theatre against the showing of The Birth of a Nation. In 1922, she led a women's anti-lynching movement, working with the NAACP. Curtis and Talbert founded the Anti-Lynching Crusaders. The group published an anti-lynching pamphlet in October 1922 called A Terrible Blot on American Civilization. The group had a feminist critique of lynching and brought both white and Black women together in this issue.

In 1924, Curtis went back to Liberia. Curtis served as a missionary for six years in Liberia, where she worked for the African Methodist Episcopal Church to build a playground, bred chickens, and taught sewing classes at Monrovia College. Both she and Du Bois were skeptical of the UNIA, headed by Marcus Garvey, and convinced Liberians to reject the UNIA plans of mass migration to the country. When she returned to her home in New York, she brought four children with her who grew up in her home.

During World War II, after the Brooklyn Civilian Defense Volunteer Office was created, Curtis was one of the first volunteers. Not only did she volunteer with the Civilian Defense Office, she also hosted sewing classes for the Red Cross at her home. By 1943, she had received a grant to open a place for Black soldiers to recuperate back in the United States. The place provided entertainment and refreshments for between 700 and 800 soldiers every week.

She spoke about her experiences in Liberia to various groups. Later, in 1947, she attended the centennial anniversary of Liberia, where she was a guest of the government. In 1948, the National Council of Negro Women honored her as one of their "Outstanding Women of the Year." When Liberian President William V. S. Tubman visited New York in 1954, Curtis was in attendance at the state luncheon held for him and other dignitaries at the Waldorf Astoria on November 4. Along with her connection to Liberia, Curtis remained active in various endeavors, including recruiting blood donors for the Red Cross.

Curtis died after a long illness in New York City on December 2, 1961. Her obituary in The New York Times only mentioned her marriage to a former diplomat and did not describe her years of service and activism.
