= Rayford Logan =

African-American historian (1897–1982)

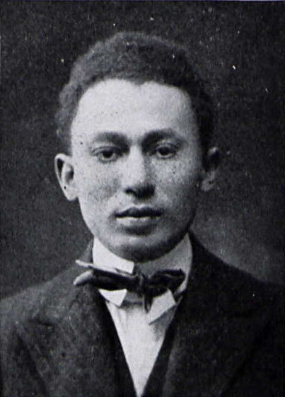
- Logan in 1917
- Born: Rayford Whittingham Logan; January 7, 1897; Washington, D.C., U.S.
- Died: November 4, 1982 (aged 85); Washington, D.C., U.S.
- Occupation: Non-fiction writer

Academic background
- Education: Williams College; Harvard University (Ph.D.)
- Alma mater: Williams College

Academic work
- Discipline: History
- Institutions: Virginia Union University; Howard University

Rayford Whittingham Logan (January 7, 1897 – November 4, 1982) was an American historian and Pan-African activist. He was best known for his study of post-Reconstruction America, a period he termed "the nadir of American race relations". In the late 1940s he was the chief advisor to the National Association for the Advancement of Colored People (NAACP) on international affairs. He was a professor of history at Howard University.

== Life ==
Rayford Logan was born and raised in Washington, D.C. He won a scholarship to Williams College, graduating in 1917. During the First World War he joined the U.S. Army, and served as a first lieutenant in the all-black 93rd infantry Division, which undertook operations with French troops. Once the war ended, Logan remained in France, absorbing both the culture and the language. He helped to co-ordinate the 2nd Pan-African Congress in Paris in 1921. He returned to the US in the early 1920s and began teaching at Virginia Union University, a historically black college in Richmond.

During the United States occupation of Haiti, Logan made a fact-finding mission to Haiti to investigate educational efforts and published his findings in The Journal of Negro History in October 1930. The main findings indicated there was little improvement in education due to the choice of Southern white Marines as country administrators – men who had been raised with Jim Crow laws in the American South and had brought their prejudice with them to their new assignment in Haiti, a majority-black republic. The main improvement effort resulted in establishing agricultural schools, which were highly expensive and staffed by non-French speakers, so classes had to be translated. The funding provided to these schools dwarfed the amount given to the majority of academic schools.

In 1930 Logan started graduate studies at Harvard University, earning an MA in 1932 and a Ph.D. in 1936. Logan became a professor at Howard University, where he practiced as a historian from 1938 to 1965.

In 1932, President Franklin D. Roosevelt appointed Logan to his Black Cabinet. Logan drafted Roosevelt's executive order prohibiting the exclusion of blacks from the military in World War II.

In 1944 he received a Rosenwald Fellowship to enable him to conduct an analysis of the Mandate period in Africa which enabled him to publish The African Mandates in World Politics (1948). In 1953 he participated in the preparatory conference for submitting the second brief to the Supreme Court as part of the Brown v Board of Education case.

In 1950–51, Logan became Director of the Association for the Study of African American Life and History (ASALH).

Logan pushed the Memoirs of a Monticello Slave into publication in 1951. The memories were those of a man named Isaac. A Virginian named Charles Campbell recorded Isaac's remembrances about 1845; however, Campbell did not publish them. Logan's publication was the first in the 20th century to illuminate the life of Sally Hemings.

Memoirs of a Monticello Slave provided source material and context for W. Edward Farrison's 1954 article "The Origins of Brown's Clotel" and Pearl M. Graham's 1961 article titled "Thomas Jefferson and Sally Hemings."

Logan was the 15th General President of Alpha Phi Alpha fraternity.

Logan died of a heart ailment at Howard University Hospital, aged 85.

== Legacy and honors ==
- In 1980, he was awarded the Spingarn Medal from the NAACP.
- His longtime residence in the Brookland section of Washington, DC, is a designated site of the city's African-American Heritage Trail.

== Selected bibliography ==
- Editor, Memoirs of a Monticello Slave (University of Virginia Press, 1951)
- The Betrayal of the Negro (1954/ Collier Books reprint 1965) online
- Dictionary of American Negro Biography (updated edition, W. W. Norton, 1982; ISBN 978-0393015133) online
- The Negro in the United States (Van Nostrand Co, 1970) online
- The Negro in American Life and Thought: The Nadir, 1877–1901 (Dial Press, 1954)
- The African Mandates in World Politics (Washington: Public Affairs Press, 1948)
- The Senate and the Versailles Mandate System (The Minorities Publishers, 1945; 1975)
- The Diplomatic Relations of the United States with Haiti, 1776–1891 (1941; 1969, ISBN 978-0527580001)
- Four Took Freedom: The Lives of Harriet Tubman, Frederick Douglass, Robert Small and Blanche K. Bruce, illustrated by Charles White; co-authored with Philip Sterling (1967, ISBN 978-0385038447)
- Haiti and the Dominican Republic (1968; Oxford University Press) online

Preceded by Charles H. Wesley	General President of Alpha Phi Alpha; 1941–1945	Succeeded by Belford Lawson, Jr.
