= Achille René-Boisneuf =

French politician

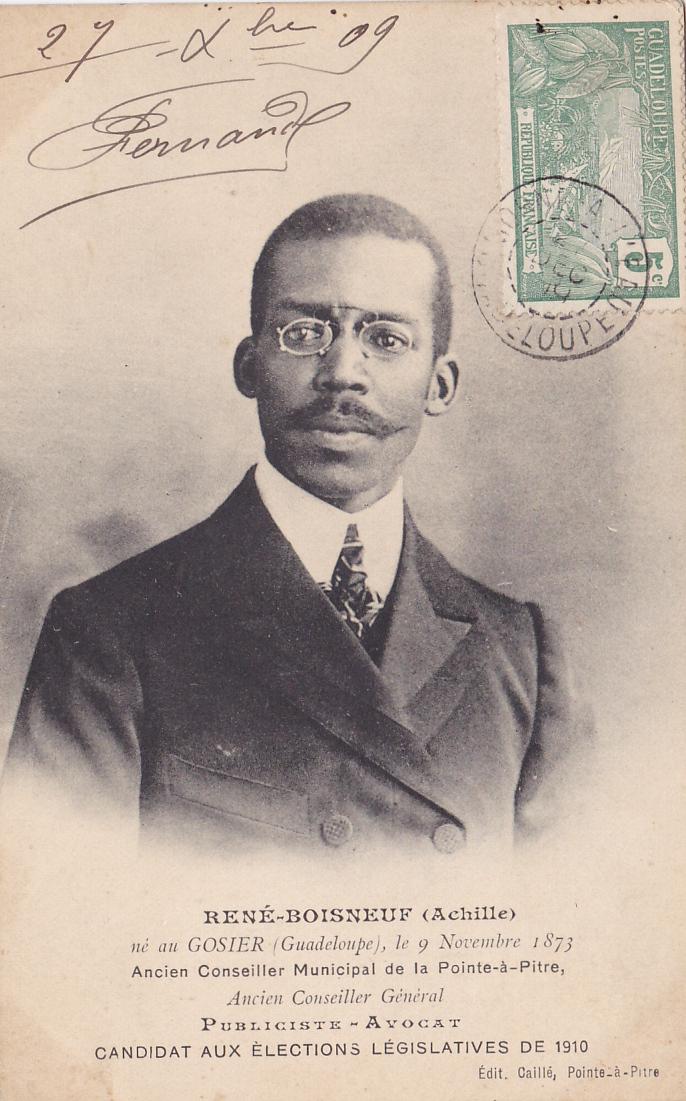

Member of the French National Assembly
- In office 1914–1924
- Constituency: Guadeloupe

Mayor of Pointe-à-Pitre
- In office 1911–1922

President of the Conseil Général of Guadeloupe
- In office 1912–1922

Personal details
- Born: November 9, 1873 Le Gosier, Guadeloupe, France
- Died: December 29, 1927 (aged 54) Pointe-à-Pitre, Guadeloupe, France
- Occupation: Politician
- Known for: One of the first Black deputies in the French National Assembly

Achille René-Boisneuf (Le Gosier, 9 November 1873 - Pointe-à-Pitre 29 December 1927) was a French politician and one of the first black deputies in the French National Assembly. He is incorrectly given the name Émile instead of Achille in Jean Joly's Dictionnaire des parlementaires français de 1889 à 1940 1946.

He was born the son of Hyacinthe Boisneuf, a well-to-do freed slave, and a farm worker, Amanda Mathurine René. He was adopted by Boisneuf and his wife and put through school. René-Boisneuf was mayor of Pointe-à-Pitre in 1911–1922, president of the Conseil Général of Guadeloupe 1912–1922 and one of Guadeloupe's deputies in Paris 1914–1924.

The rue Achille René-Boisneuf in Pointe-à-Pitre is named after him.

== Biography ==
Achille was the natural son of Hyacinthe Boisneuf, a freed slave and future mayor of Le Gosier, and Amanda Mathurine René, a farm worker. He was adopted by Boisneuf and his wife, which enabled him to attend secondary school. At a very young age, he campaigned alongside Légitimus before leaving him, denouncing the Capital-Labor Agreement that the latter defended. In 1900, he was elected municipal councilor of Pointe-à-Pitre under the banner of the Democratic Party, heir to Alexandre Isaac, and became first deputy until Légitimus took over the town hall in 1904. He was re-elected in the 1908 elections and then left for metropolitan France to obtain his law degree in 1909 and become a lawyer at the Guadeloupe Court of Appeal in 1910. In 1910, he defended striking workers at the Darboussier sugar factory in Pointe-à-Pitre, then striking agricultural workers, but following suspicious electoral maneuvers, he was defeated by Légitimus in the 1910 legislative elections.

In 1911, he became mayor of Pointe-à-Pitre. In 1913, he became president of the Guadeloupe General Council, a position he held until 1915. In 1914, he was elected representative of Guadeloupe in the Grande Terre constituency, joining the Radical and Radical-Socialist group and advocating for the extension of labor legislation to the Antilles to allow workers to organize. On September 11, 1915, he and Joseph Lagrosillière, representative of Martinique, introduced a bill reforming the status of Guadeloupe, Martinique, and Réunion.

In 1919, he was re-elected by list voting (alongside Gratien Candace and representing the whole of Guadeloupe) as a deputy under the banner of the Republican and Socialist Union. That same year, following racist incidents in Saint-Nazaire, he called on the government, alongside Joseph Lagrosillière, deputy for Martinique, “to put an end to the harassment, offenses, and crimes to which French citizens or subjects of color have been victims in the territory for some time.” On July 25, 1919, he spoke in the Chamber of Deputies about the murder of a Guadeloupe, Saint-Éloi Etilce, on April 22, 1919, in Nantes by an American military policeman.

But during the municipal elections of December 21, 1919, he was accused of fraud, and in 1922, the elections were annulled. The Socialists, led by Hildevert-Adolphe Lara, waged a fierce campaign against him, and Boisneuf lost the mayoralty in the elections. In 1924, his break with Gratien Candace caused him to lose the benefit of a joint list in the list-based voting system. In September 1924, he was accused of planting a bomb in Gosier and imprisoned, but the investigation ultimately cleared him. After winning the Pointe-à-Pitre mayoralty again in 1925, he resigned in 1926 and died in 1927 at the age of 54.
