= Benjamin F. Seldon =

Benjamin Franklin Seldon, usually referred to as Benjamin F. Seldon or B. F. Seldon, was an African American educator. He served in World War I as a YMCA secretary, taught at the University of Toulouse, and was State Supervisor of Negro Adult Education in New Jersey in the late 1930s. He was a collaborator and correspondent with the Pan-Africanist intellectual W. E. B. Du Bois.

== Life ==
Seldon studied at Centenary Collegiate Institute, graduating in 1903. In a 1924 résumé preserved in the Du Bois papers, Seldon claimed to have been "prepared for college at Phillips Exeter Academy", before studying at New York City College, Boston University and Harvard University. Though his name is not found in the 1787-1903 register, he was writing from Exeter Academy in April 1905, putting himself forward to W. E. B. DuBois as a potential agent for the distribution of The Souls of Black Folk.

In 1905 he was YMCA Secretary at New Haven, a job he took for two years. He then worked at the Colored Orphan Asylum in New York City, and as Principal of the Freehold Grammar School in Freehold, New Jersey. When Du Bois founded The Crisis in 1910 Seldon was an employee for a few months.

In World War I Seldon served as a YMCA secretary with allied military in France, a space in which African American and West African soldiers interacted. Seldon created a set of illustrated drawings of black servicemen, intending to sell them as souvenir postcards:

The painted scenes included American black officers leading men into battle, African American troops taking German prisoners, and an African American and West African soldier exchanging salutes above a caption that read 'Fraternal Salute' In 1919, Seldon sent examples of these poscards to Du Bois, noting on the back of one that he had printed 2,500 copies but 'the colored boys saled before we could get them on the market They are now in a cellar in Paris'.

Seldon stayed in Europe after the war. He attended the first Pan African Congress in 1919. He also offered to help W. E. B. DuBois with organization of the second Pan African Congress in 1921, though in the event was unable to attend the congress. He married a wealthy Frenchwoman and taught at the University of Toulouse, studying social conditions within European countries. There in the mid-1920s, he passed on copies of The Crisis to black students from French colonies. As he wrote to W. E. B. DuBois in 1925, "I have asked myself, and that very seriously, why not an International A.A.C.P.?"

In the late 1920s Seldon returned to the US, working at a new plantation operated by the Southern Sugar Company, Azucar, in Canal Point, Florida, There he established and acted as principal of a grammar school, and established other community institutions:

We have a fine community house for the young girls and mothers which is well furnished; there is a large social hall with pool tables, piano radio, reading room etc. for the men. We did away with prostitution and bootlegging, which almost cost me my life but it was worth it, and in the place of these things we have substituted clean wholesome environments of every kind possible. But best of all, I think, was making the people see that their preachers were not of the right type and the establishment of better homes and unusual fine lawns and public baths and toilets.

Seldon returned to Toulouse in the early 1930s, and for the next few years moved between France and America. He hoped to complete "a comparative study (political, economic, religious, social and educational) of the southern Negro and the European peasant", though the book was never published. He helped supervise an anthology of black poetry, edited by Beatrice F. Wormley and Charles W. Carter. From 1938 to 1941 he was State Supervisor of Negro Adult Education for the New Jersey Works Progress Administration. In 1944 he was working as a 'Promotion Specialist' for the Interracial Section of the War Finance Division of the US Treasury.

Seldon died in Newark City Hospital on August 5, 1949. He was survived by his wife, who continued living in Cier-de-Rivière, France. Seldon's papers are held at the New York Public Library, and correspondence with Du Bois is held at the University of Massachusetts Amherst.
