= Edmund Fitzgerald Fredericks =

Lawyer and educator

Edmund Fitzgerald Fredericks (1874 or 1875–1935) was a lawyer and educator from British Guiana.

Fredericks came to the United States to study to become a lawyer, settling in North Carolina in 1903. He graduated from Shaw University in 1905. He became the principal and teacher of the segregated Mooresville Colored School. He worked there until 1917, then moved to England, where he worked during World War I in the War Office. Fredericks became involved in the African Progress Union (APU). Fredericks served as a delegate to the first Pan-African Congress in 1919. That same year, he returned to British Guiana.

Fredericks, along with Theodore Theophilus Nichols started the Negro Progress Convention (NPC) in 1922. This organization was meant to assist Black people in British Guiana, and worldwide. In 1923, he was living in Georgetown, Guyana. Fredericks created trade schools for young people and established scholarships for students to study at university. Fredericks was also on Executive and Legislative Councils in British Guiana.

Fredericks died at age 60 on April 6, 1935.
