= Tertullien Guilbaud =

Haitian diplomat (1856–1937)

- Born: May 22, 1856; Port-de-Paix, Haiti
- Died: May 22, 1937 (aged 81)
- Occupations: Lawyer; diplomat; poet
- Known for: Signing the Treaty of Versailles
- Notable work: Anthologie d’un Siècle de Poésie Haitienne
- Office: Envoy to Paris

Tertullien Guilbaud (May 22, 1856 – May 22, 1937) was a Haitian lawyer, diplomat, and poet.

== Early life and education ==
Guilbaud was born in Port-de-Paix on May 22, 1856. He worked as a professor at the Lycee Phillippe-Guerrier and opened a law school in 1894.

== Diplomatic and political career ==
In 1896, Guilbaud became Chief of the Cabinet of President Tirésias Simon Sam.

As the envoy to Paris for Haiti, Guilbaud signed the peace treaty that led to the formal end of World War I on behalf of the President of Haiti. While negotiating the Treaty of Versailles, he was compelled by the United States government to reject a clause banning racial discrimination in the League of Nations. Guilbaud was also an honored delegate of the first Pan-African Congress. He later served as Minister of Public Education under the administration of President Sténio Vincent.

== Literary contributions ==
Guilbaud was also a poet, known for his patriotic poetry, which was included in the Anthologie d’un Siècle de Poésie Haitienne, edited by Louis Morpeau.

== Death ==
Guilbaud died on May 22, 1937.
