= George Rubin Hutto =

American educator and Pan-African Congress delegate

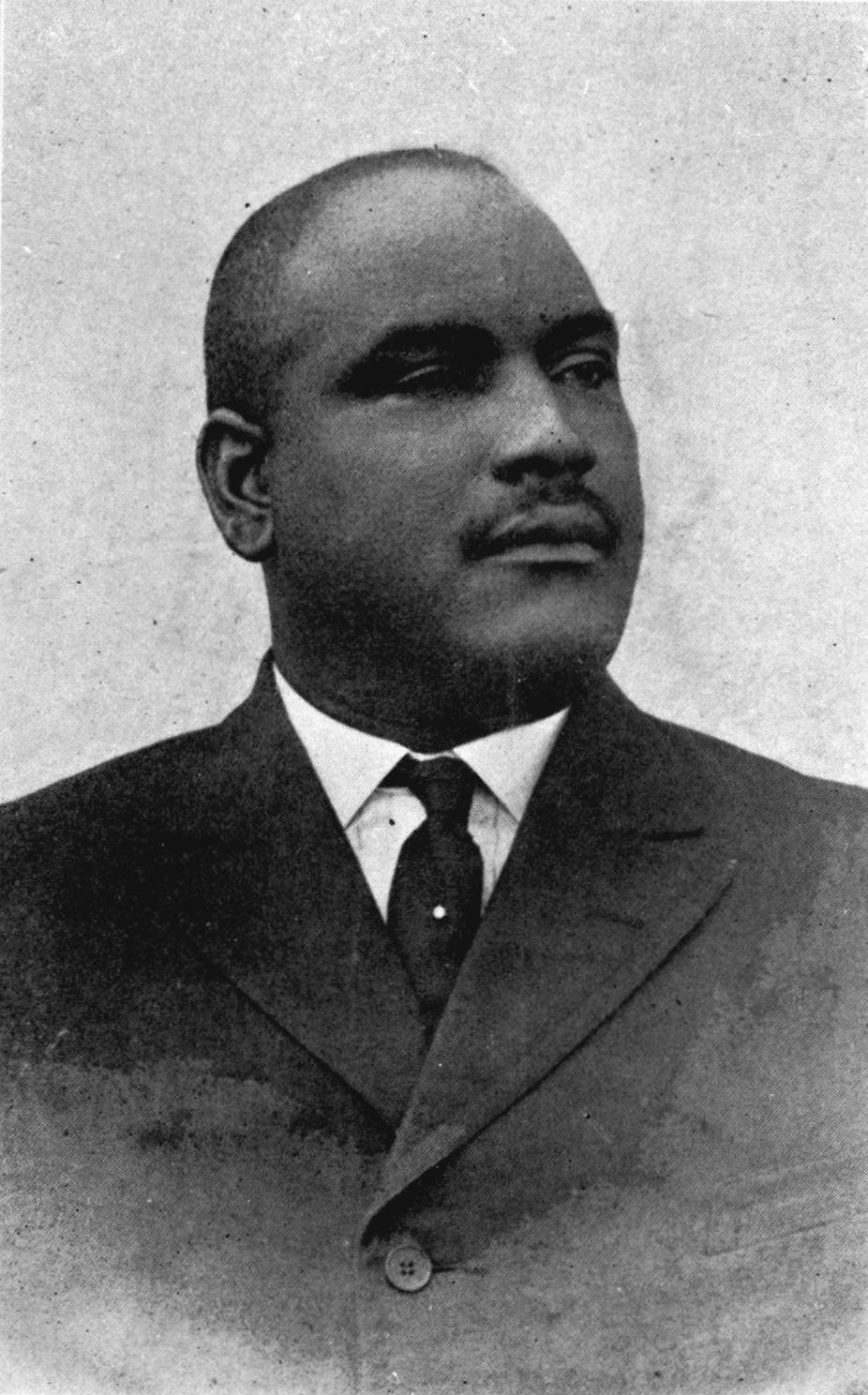
- Portrait of George Rubin Hutto
- Born: March 6, 1870; Barnwell County, South Carolina, U.S.
- Died: July 14, 1922 (aged 52); Bainbridge, Georgia, U.S.
- Education: Claflin University
- Occupation: Educator
- Known for: Participation in the Pan-African Congress, leadership in the Knights of Pythias
- Spouse: Addie E. Dillard
- Children: 2

George Rubin (Reuben) Hutto (March 6, 1870 – July 14, 1922) was an American educator, prominent member of the Knights of Pythias, and a delegate to the first and third Pan-African Congresses.

== Biography ==
George Rubin Hutto was born on March 6, 1870, in Barnwell County, South Carolina. He graduated from Claflin University in 1890. On July 19, 1892, he married Addie E. Dillard, with whom he had two sons.

Hutto began his teaching career in Belton, South Carolina, where he taught for two years before moving to a position near Camilla, Georgia. In 1895, Hutto was elected principal of the Bainbridge Colored Grade School in Bainbridge, Georgia. He played a significant role in the education of African American children in the region and was a respected community leader.

Starting in 1897, Hutto became actively involved in the Knights of Pythias, eventually rising to the rank of Grand Chancellor of the Georgia branch. His involvement in fraternal organizations extended beyond the Knights of Pythias, as he was also a member of the Odd Fellows and the Masons.

In addition to his educational and fraternal work, Hutto was an influential figure in the Pan-African movement. He attended both the first and third Pan-African Congresses, held in 1919 and 1921 respectively. These congresses were significant in shaping the global dialogue on the rights and status of people of African descent.

Hutto's life was tragically cut short when he died from complications of a stroke on July 14, 1922. His death was a significant loss to the Bainbridge community. On the day of his funeral, July 18, 1922, all businesses in Bainbridge closed in a show of respect for his passing. After his death, his wife, Addie Dillard Hutto, took over as principal of the public school he had led. The school was later renamed in his honor, becoming a lasting legacy of his contributions to education and the community.

== Legacy ==
George Rubin Hutto's legacy as an educator, community leader, and advocate for African American rights continues to be remembered in Bainbridge, Georgia. The school named in his honor stands as a testament to his dedication to improving the lives of African Americans through education. His involvement in the Pan-African Congresses highlights his commitment to the global struggle for the rights of people of African descent.
