= Lormaye =

- Commune
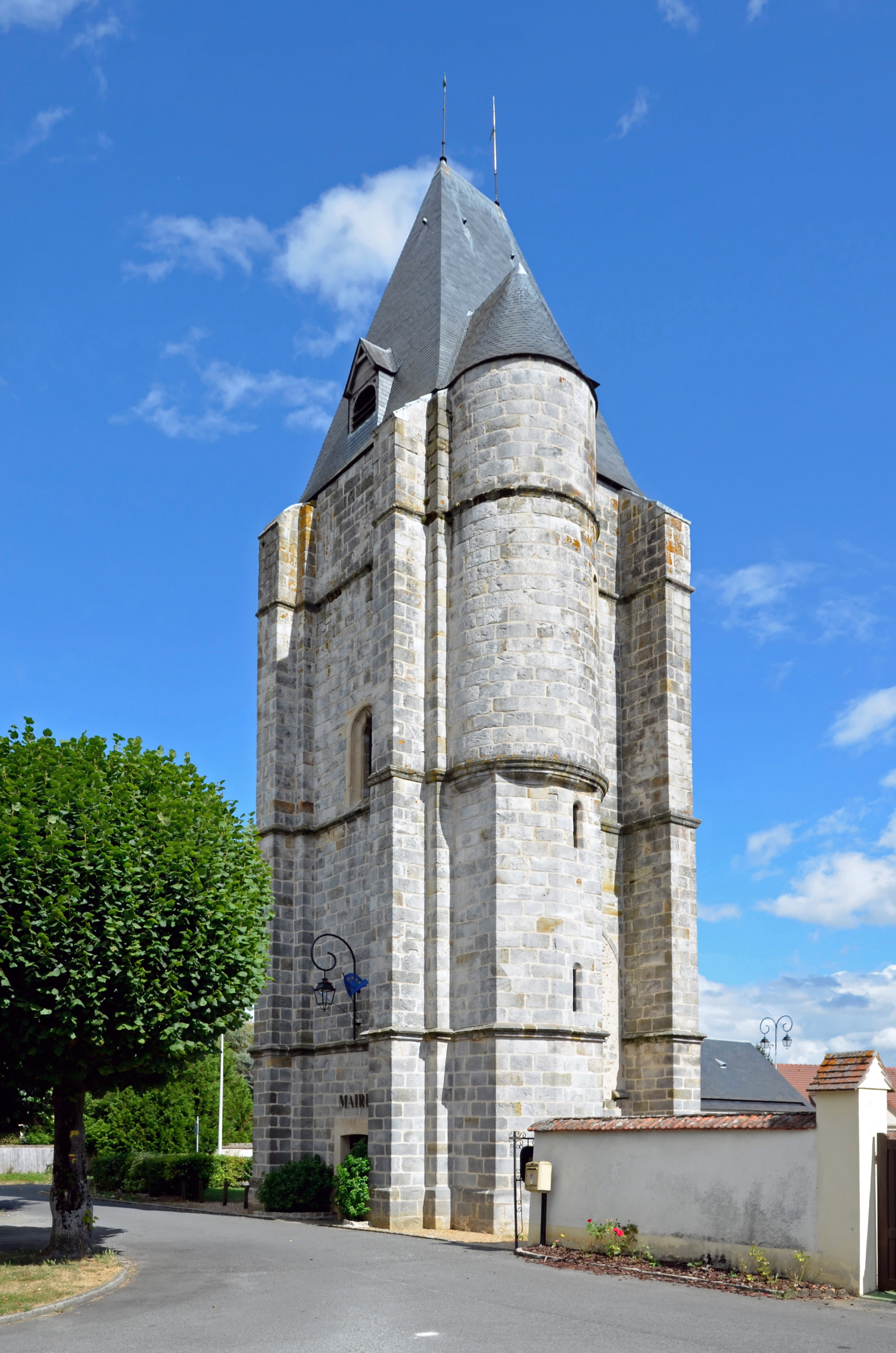
- Tour du pilori

- Coat of arms
- Location of Lormaye
- Location within France Location within Centre-Val de Loire
- Coordinates: 48°38′50″N 1°32′23″E
- Country: France
- Region: Centre-Val de Loire
- Department: Eure-et-Loir
- Arrondissement: Dreux
- Canton: Épernon

Government
  - Mayor (2020–2026): Bertrand Thirouin
- Area^{1}: 1.43 km^{2} (0.55 sq mi)
- Elevation: 96 m (315 ft)
- Highest elevation: 129 m (423 ft)
- Lowest elevation: 91 m (299 ft)
- Population (2023): 686
  - Density: 480/km^{2} (1,240/sq mi)
- Time zone: UTC+01:00 (CET)
  - Summer (DST): UTC+02:00 (CEST)
- INSEE/Postal code: 28213 /28210
- ^{1} French Land Register data, which excludes lakes, ponds, glaciers > 1 km^{2} (0.386 sq mi or 247 acres) and river estuaries.

Lormaye (French pronunciation: [lɔʁmɛ]) is a commune in the Eure-et-Loir department in northern France.

== Population ==
Historical population
Year	Pop.	±% p.a.
1968	531	—
1975	520	−0.30%
1982	520	+0.00%
1990	562	+0.98%
1999	575	+0.25%
2007	630	+1.15%
2012	649	+0.60%
2017	661	+0.37%
2023	686	+0.62%
Source: INSEE

== See also ==
- Communes of the Eure-et-Loir department
