= Joseph Lagrosillière =

French politician (1872–1950)

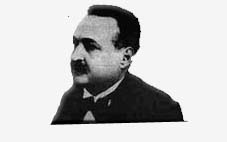

Deputy of the National Assembly
- In office 24 April 1910 – 31 May 1924
- In office 1 May 1932 – 31 May 1942

Personal details
- Born: 2 November 1872 Sainte-Marie, Martinique
- Died: 6 January 1950 (aged 77) Paris, (Seine)
- Party: Parti socialiste (10th chamber, Third Republic); Parti socialiste de France (15th chamber); Union socialiste et républicaine (16th chamber)
- Occupation: politician, magistrate, farmer

Joseph Lagrosillière (2 November 1872 – 6 January 1950) was a French lawyer and politician. He was mayor of Sainte-Marie from 1910 to 1936 and deputy of Martinique from 1910 to 1924 and from 1932 to 1942. He was also president of the General Council of Martinique from 1935 to 1937 and from 1945 to 1946. Lagrosillière was the founder of the socialist movement in Martinique and one of the most important political figures on the island during the first half of the 20th century.

== Biography ==
He went to France to study law at the colonial school of the Faculty of Law in Paris. While there he befriended Jules Guesde and became active in the West Indies socialist group in Paris from 1896. Lagrosillière was called to the bar in Paris and Tunis on 29 June 1898. He was admitted to the Fort-de-France bar on his return to the Martinique in 1901. The same year, he created the first Socialist Federation of Martinique. Then he founded the newspaper Le Prolétaire, of which he was also the editor-in-chief.

Joseph Lagrosillière was a candidate for the legislative elections in the northern constituency in 1902, but because of the eruption of Mount Pelée on 8 May, the second round scheduled for 11 May did not take place. He lost a large part of his family in the disaster. Devastated, he moved to Saint Pierre and Miquelon for two years. He was elected deputy in the North in 1910 and re-elected in 1914. He was elected mayor of Sainte-Marie and remained the town's chief magistrate for 26 years.

In 1913, considering himself insulted in a newspaper article, Lagrosillière challenged the procurer general of Martinique, Jules Liontel, to a duel. A court of honour found Liontel too old to accept, but his son insisted that he substitute for his father. The contest was held on 5 February; the younger Liontel lost to Lagrosillière. In a disagreement with the metropolitan socialist deputies on the issue of assimilation, he resigned from the socialist group in the Chamber of Deputies that July. A fierce supporter of assimilation, Lagrosillière, together with the Guadeloupean deputy Achille René-Boisneuf, presented a bill to reform the Constitution of Guadeloupe, Martinique and Réunion in 1914, which would have transformed the colonies into departments of France.

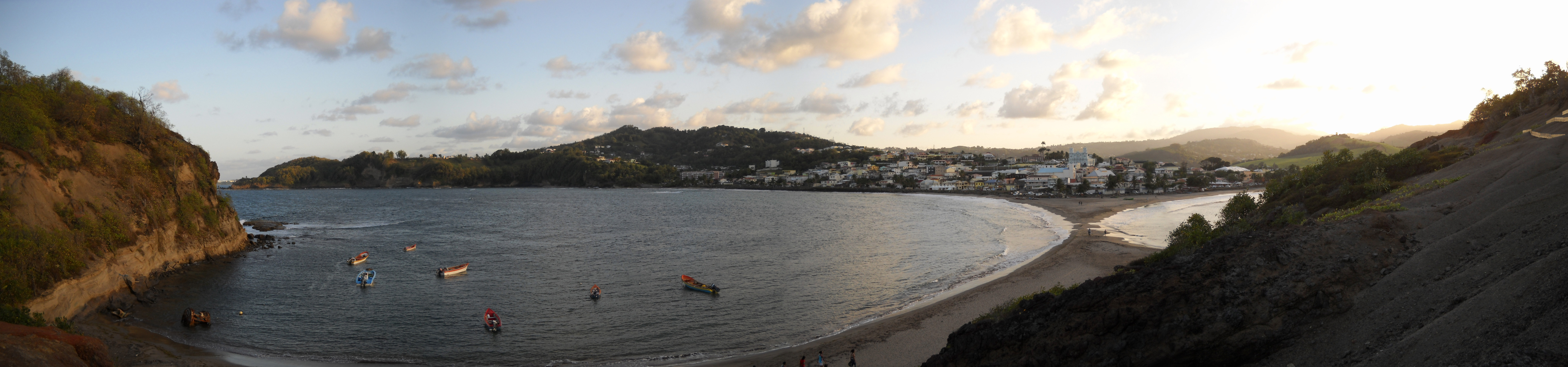
Sainte-Marie, Martinique and Tombolo

In 1919, he made a political alliance with Fernand Clerc, leader of the progressive factory owners, at the "Banquet de Sainte-Marie" for the following legislative elections against his opponent Sévère, who was allied with the conservative Békés. He was elected as a deputy in the South for the next five years. The same year, he became president of the General Council, which he presided over until 1939. He was imprisoned after the municipal elections and the strike of 1925 for inciting unrest and violence.

Joseph Lagrosillière was arrested in 1931 for "trafic d'influence" (a type of corruption) and imprisoned in Le Havre, France. Despite his legal troubles, he was re-elected as a deputy in the South of Martinique in 1932, during this term, he established the "Fédération des indigènes d'outre-mer"; Paulette Nardal was his parliamentary assistant and press officer. He remained deputy of Martinique until the outbreak of the Second World War in France. Joseph Lagrosillière fought his last political battle in the 1945 municipal elections in Fort-de-France, where he was beaten by more than 5000 votes by the young communist candidate, Aimé Césaire.

Joseph Lagrosillière died on 6 January 1950, at the age of 77.

== Political career ==
- 1910 to 1936: Mayor of Sainte-Marie
- 1935 to 1937; 1945 to 1946: President of the General Council of Martinique
- 1910 to 1924 and from 1932 to 1940: Deputy of Martinique

== Publications ==
1900s founded and ran the newspaper Le Prolétaire

1903 La question de la Martinique, Paris : éditions du "Mouvement socialiste", 1903

1908 A la Martinique. L'Entente républicaine en face de la réaction coloniale, discours prononcé à la fête d'inauguration du marché couvert de Sainte-Marie le 15 août 1908

1900s founded and ran the newspaper Le Bloc with Amédée Knight;

1930s La Résistance : organe socialiste..., Fort-de-France

1938 Rapport présenté à la Commission de l'Algérie, des colonies et pays de protectorat, au nom de la Sous-commission d'enquête en Algérie, sur les résultats des investigations de la Sous-commission relativement aux divers moyens préconisés pour étendre les droits politiques des indigènes algériens

== Sources ==
- Joseph Lagrosillière, socialiste colonial, biography in 3 volumes written by Camille Darsières, éditions Désormeaux, 1999 - Volume 1 : "Les années pures, 1872-1919", Volume 2 : "Les années dures, 1920-1931", Tome 3 : "La remontée, 1932-1950".
- La question de la Martinique : réponse aux calomnies et aux diffamations de M. Gérault-Richard. Paris: Groupe socialiste des Antilles. 1903.
