= Pan-Africanism =

Movement encouraging solidarity among people of African ancestry

The red, black, and green flag, associated with Pan-Africanism and Black nationalism designed by the UNIA in 1920.

Pan-Africanism is a movement that aims to encourage and strengthen bonds of solidarity between all indigenous peoples of Africa along with all peoples of African descent. Based on a common goal dating back to the Atlantic slave trade, the Trans-Saharan slave trade, the Indian Ocean slave trade, the Red Sea slave trade, slavery in the Cape Colony, Inboekstelsel, slavery in Mauritius, and the Khoikhoi-Dutch Wars, the belief extends beyond continental Africans with a substantial support base among the African diaspora in the Americas and Europe.

Pan-Africanism is said to have its origins in the struggles of the sub-Saharan Africans against enslavement and colonization. This struggle may be traced back to the first resistance on slave ships, including rebellions and suicides, through the constant plantation and colonial uprisings and the "Back to Africa" movements of the 19th century. Based on the belief that unity is vital to economic, social, and political progress, it aims to unify and uplift people of African ancestry. However, it was in the twentieth century that Pan-Africanism emerged as a distinct political movement that was initially formed and led by people from the Diaspora (people of African heritage living outside of the Continent). In 1900, Henry Sylvester Williams, a Trinindadian barrister, called a conference that took place in London's Westminster Hall to "protest stealing of lands in the colonies, racial discrimination and deal with other issues of interest to Blacks".

At its core, Pan-Africanism is a belief that "African people, both on the continent and in the diaspora, share not merely a common history, but a common destiny." Pan-Africanism posits a sense of a shared historical fate for Africans in the Americas, the West Indies, and on the continent itself, centered on the Atlantic trade in slaves, African slavery, and European imperialism.

Pan-African thought influenced the establishment of the Organisation of African Unity (since succeeded by the African Union) in 1963. The African Union Commission has its seat in Addis Ababa and the Pan-African Parliament has its seat in Midrand, Johannesburg.

== Overview ==
Pan-Africanism stresses the need for "collective self-reliance". Pan-Africanism exists as a governmental and grassroots objective. Pan-African advocates include leaders such as Toussaint Louverture, Jean-Jacques Dessalines, Henri Christophe, François Duvalier, Aimé Césaire, Haile Selassie, Jomo Kenyatta, Edward Wilmot Blyden, Nnamdi Azikiwe, Patrice Lumumba, Julius Nyerere, Robert Sobukwe, Ahmed Sékou Touré, Kwame Nkrumah, Gamal Abdel Nasser, King Sobhuza II, Robert Mugabe, Thomas Sankara, Kwame Ture, Ahmed Ben Bella, John Magufuli, Muammar Gaddafi, Walter Rodney, Yoweri Kaguta Museveni, grassroots organizers such as Joseph Robert Love, Marcus Garvey, and Malcolm X, academics such as W. E. B. Du Bois, Anténor Firmin and others in the diaspora. Pan-Africanists believe that solidarity will enable the continent to fulfil its potential to independently provide for all its people. Crucially, an all-African alliance would empower African people globally.

The realization of the Pan-African objective would lead to "power consolidation in Africa", which "would compel a reallocation of global resources, as well as unleashing a fiercer psychological energy and political assertion ... that would unsettle social and political (power) structures...in the Americas".

Advocates of Pan-Africanism—i.e. "Pan-Africans" or "Pan-Africanists"—often champion socialist principles and tend to be opposed to external political and economic involvement on the continent. Critics accuse the ideology of homogenizing the experience of people of African ancestry. They also point to the difficulties of reconciling current divisions within countries on the continent and within communities in the diaspora.

As a philosophy, Pan-Africanism represents the aggregation of the historical, cultural, spiritual, artistic, scientific, and philosophical legacies of Africans from past times to the present. Pan-Africanism as an ethical system traces its origins from ancient times, and promotes values that are the product of the African civilisations and the struggles against slavery, racism, colonialism, and neocolonialism.

== History ==
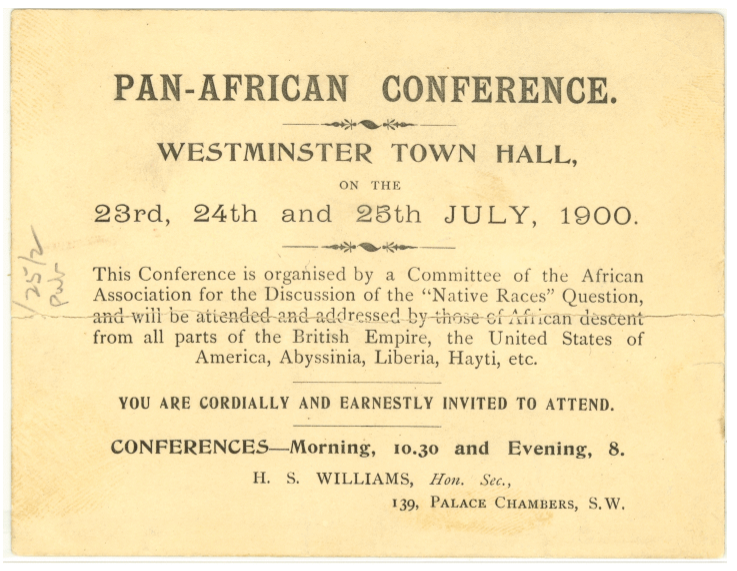
Invitation to Pan-African Conference at Westminster Town Hall, London, July 1900

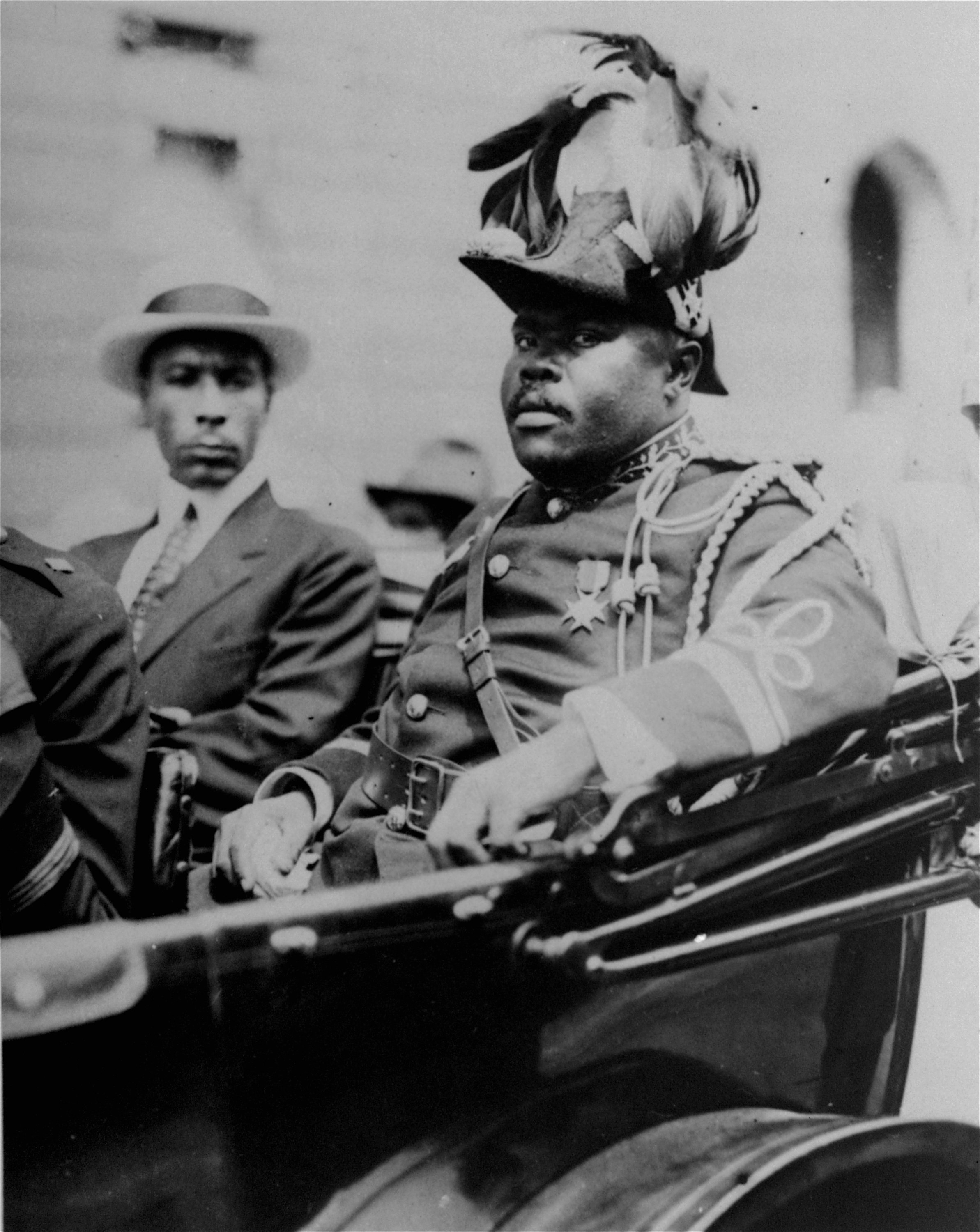
Jamaican Marcus Garvey in a military uniform as the "Provisional President of Africa" during a parade on the opening day of the annual Convention of the Negro Peoples of the World on Lenox Avenue in Harlem, New York City, 1922

=== Intellectual and social origins ===
Coinciding with numerous New World slave insurrections (hallmarked by the Haitian Revolution), the end of the 19th century birthed an intercontinental pro-African political movement that sought to unify disparate campaigns in the goal to end oppression. It was diasporic Africans' removal from the continent that enabled them to view it as a whole. Another important political form of a religious Pan-Africanist worldview appeared in the form of Ethiopianism. In London, the Sons of Africa was a political group addressed by Quobna Ottobah Cugoano in the 1791 edition of his book Thoughts and Sentiments on the Evil of Slavery. The group addressed meetings and organised letter-writing campaigns, published campaigning material and visited parliament. They wrote to figures such as Granville Sharp, William Pitt and other members of the white abolition movement, as well as King George III and the Prince of Wales, the future George IV.

=== First organisations ===
Modern Pan-Africanism began around the start of the 20th century. The African Association, later renamed the Pan-African Association, was established around 1897 by Henry Sylvester Williams, who organized the First Pan-African Conference in London in 1900.

The Pan-African Congress series of meetings followed 1900's First Pan-African Conference that was held in London. A meeting of the Congress in 1919 in Paris (1st Pan-African Congress), 1921 in London (2nd Pan-African Congress), 1923 in London (3rd Pan-African Congress), 1927 in New York City (4th Pan-African Congress), and 1945 in Manchester (5th Pan-African Congress) advanced the issue of decolonisation in Africa.

Among inhabitants of the African continent, it was the shared experience of colonial rule and resistance to it that fostered a unified African identity. Pan Africanism wasn’t just an idea, it pushed African countries to stand with Africa. Many African countries received exiles, protected them, and supported the liberation movement and helped fight apartheid because they saw South Africa’s struggle as Africa’s struggle. In the 1930s, Dr Nnamdi Azikiwe's anti-colonial writings from the United States, Accra, and Lagos established him as the most prominent Pan-Africanist in the British West Africa. Then-Colonial Secretary Oliver Stanley called Azikiwe (Zik) "the biggest danger of the lot." Zik drew his inspiration on the Pan-African ideas of West Indians and African-Americans such as Edward Wilmot Blyden, W.E.B. Du Bois, and Marcus Garvey, as well as West Africans such as J.E. Casely Hayford and his allies in the National Congress of British West Africa. In his publication "Renascent Africa", he offered a vague program for a "New Africa," modeled on the New Negro Movement articulated by Alain Locke. Outside his writings, Azikiwe actively participated in Pan-African politics, promulgating intellectually, in person around the Black Atlantic from West Africa and the Caribbean to the United States and Western Europe.

The Fifth Pan-African Congress was a significant gathering, which brought together anti-colonial activists from the African continent and the Diaspora. Women such as Amy Ashwood Garvey and Amy Jacques Garvey helped to organise the Congress meeting and played a crucial role in the conferences.

=== Decolonisation and power ===
With the independence of Ghana in March 1957, Kwame Nkrumah was elected as the first Prime Minister and President of the State. Nkrumah emerged as a major advocate for the unity of Independent Africa. The Ghanaian President embodied a political activist approach to pan-Africanism as he championed the "quest for regional integration of the whole of the African continent". This period represented a "golden age of high pan-African ambitions"; the continent had experienced revolution and decolonization from Western powers and the narrative of rebirth and solidarity had gained momentum within the pan-African movement.

Nkrumah's pan-African principles intended for a union between the Independent African states upon a recognition of their commonality (i.e. suppression under imperialism). Pan-Africanism under Nkrumah evolved past the assumptions of a racially exclusive movement associated with black Africa, and adopted a political discourse of regional unity

In April 1958, Nkrumah hosted the first All-African Peoples' Conference (AAPC) in Accra, Ghana. This conference invited delegates of political movements as well as major political leaders. With the exception of South Africa, all independent states of the African continent attended: Egypt, Ethiopia, Ghana, Liberia, Libya, Morocco, Tunisia, and Sudan. This conference signified a monumental event in the pan-African movement, as it revealed a political and social union between those considered Arabic states and the black African regions. Furthermore, the conference espoused a common African Nationalist identity of unity and anti-Imperialism throughout the states. Frantz Fanon, journalist, freedom fighter and a member of the Algerian FLN party attended the conference as a delegate for Algeria.

Considering the armed struggle of the FLN against French colonial rule, the Conference attendees agreed to support the struggle of those States under colonial oppression. This encouraged the commitment of direct involvement in the "emancipation of the Continent; thus, a fight against colonial pressures on South Africa was declared and the full support of the FLN struggle in Algeria, against French colonial rule". Tom Mboya, a Kenyan trade unionist and anti-colonial activist, also attended this conference. This visit inspired him to increase the pace of political activity aimed at agitating for Kenya's independence.

In the following years, the Accra Conference also marked the establishment of a new foreign policy of non-alignment between the US and USSR, as well as the will to establish an "African Identity" in global affairs by advocating unity between the African States on international relations. "This would be based on the Bandung Declaration, the Charter of the UN and on loyalty to UN decisions."

In 1959, Nkrumah, President Sékou Touré of Guinea and President William Tubman of Liberia met at Sanniquellie and signed the Sanniquellie Declaration outlining the principles for the achievement of the unity of Independent African States whilst maintaining a national identity and autonomous constitutional structure. The Declaration called for a revised understanding of Pan-Africanism and the uniting of the independent states.

In 1960, the second All-African Peoples' Conference was held in Addis Ababa, Ethiopia. The membership of the All-African Peoples' Organisation (AAPO) had increased with the inclusion of the "Algerian Provisional Government (as they had not yet won independence), Cameroun, Guinea, Nigeria, Somalia and the United Arab Republic". The Conference highlighted diverging ideologies within the movement, as Nkrumah's call for a political and economic union between the Independent African States gained little agreement. The disagreements following 1960 gave rise to two rival factions within the pan-African movement: the Casablanca Bloc and the Brazzaville Bloc.

In 1962, Algeria gained independence from French colonial rule and Ahmed Ben Bella assumed the Presidency. Ben Bella was a strong advocate for Pan-Africanism and African Unity. Following the FLN's armed struggle for liberation, Ben Bella spoke at the UN and espoused for Independent Africa's role in providing military and financial support to the African liberation movements opposing apartheid and fighting Portuguese colonialism. In search of a united voice, in 1963 at an African Summit conference in Addis Ababa, Ethiopia, 32 African states met and established the Organisation of African Unity (OAU). The OAU Charter defined a coordinated "effort to raise the standard of living of member States and defend their sovereignty" by supporting freedom fighters and decolonisation. As a result, the African Liberation Committee (ALC), was formed during the summit. Championing the support of liberation movements, Ben Bella immediately "donated 100 million francs to its finances and was one of the first countries, of the Organisation to boycott Portuguese and South African goods".

In 1969, Algiers hosted the Pan-African Cultural Festival, on July 21 and it continued for eight days. At this moment in history, Algeria stood as a "beacon of African and Third-World militancy," and would come to inspire fights against colonialism around the world. The festival attracted thousands from African states and the African Diaspora, including the Black Panthers. It represented the application of the tenets of the Algerian revolution to the rest of Africa and symbolized the reshaping of the definition of pan-African identity under the common experience of colonialism. The Festival further strengthened the standing of Algeria's President Boumediene in Africa and the Third World.

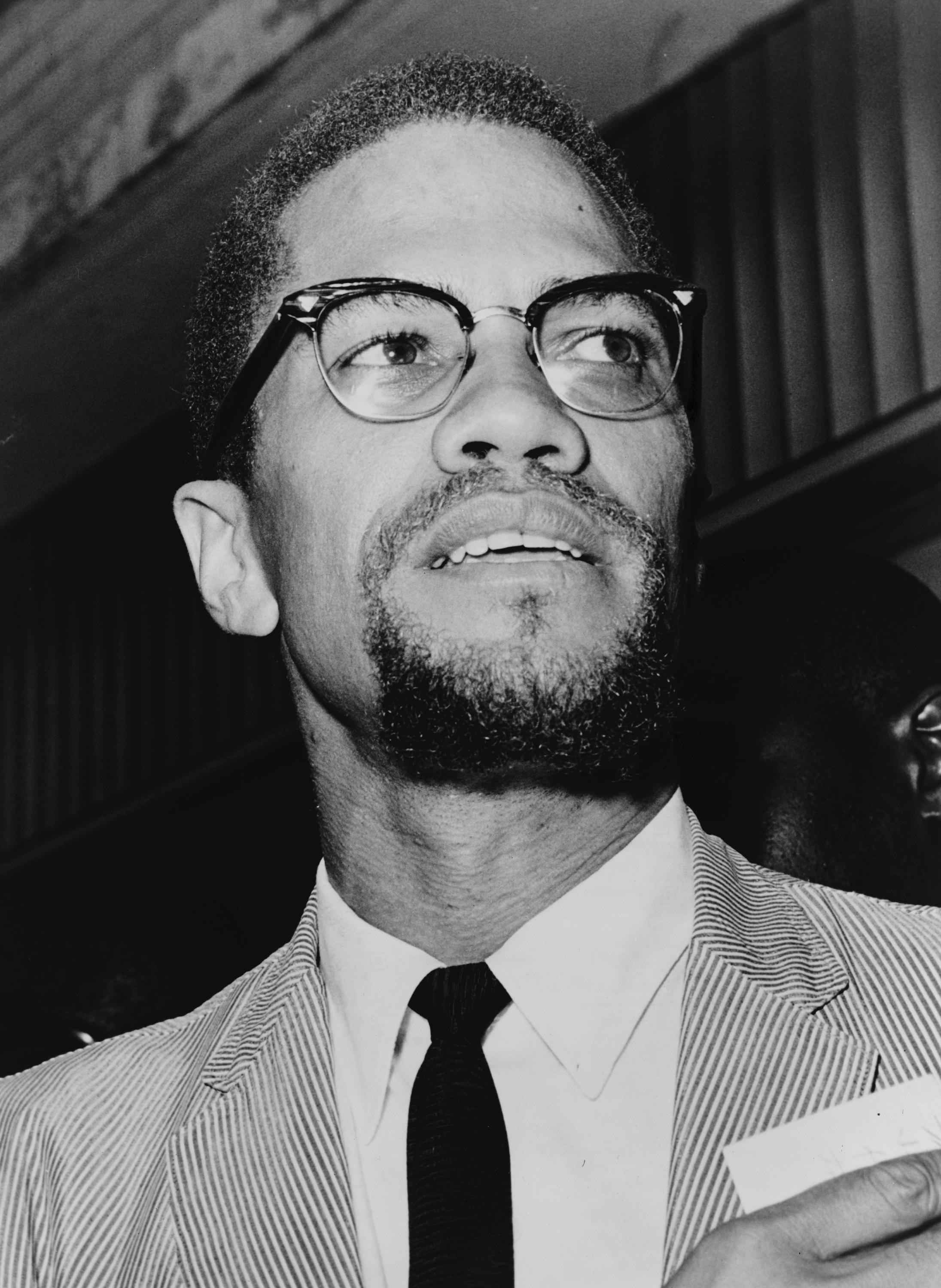
Malcolm X (1964; aged 39)

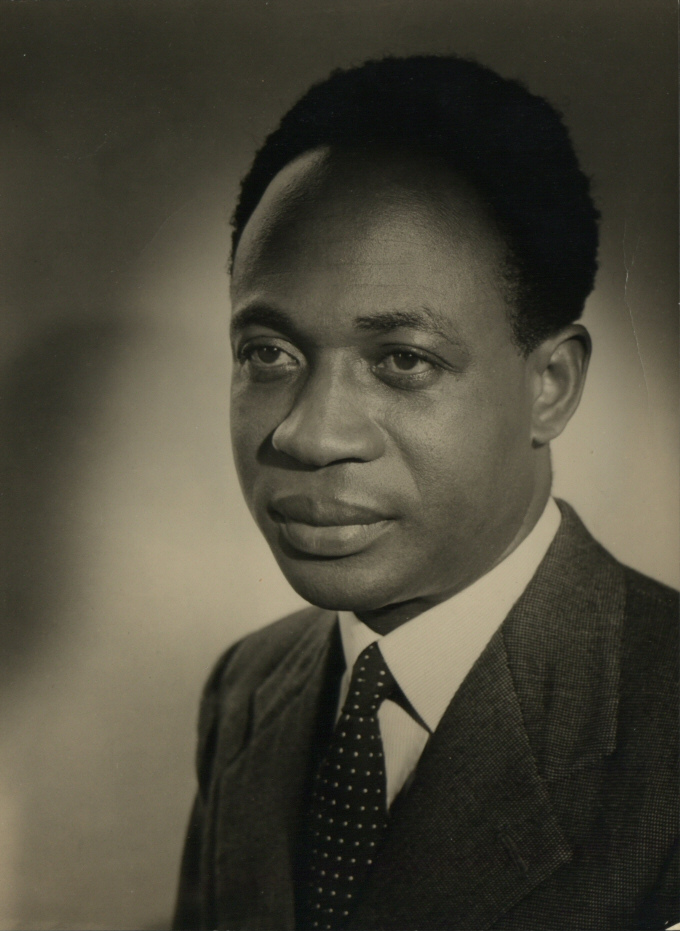
Kwame Nkrumah, an icon of pan-Africanism

After the death of Kwame Nkrumah in 1972, Muammar Gaddafi assumed the mantle of leader of the Pan-Africanist movement and became the most outspoken advocate of African Unity, like Nkrumah before him – for the advent of a "United States of Africa".

It was not until the 1994 Seventh Pan-African Congress in Uganda, that women's issues were specifically addressed. For the first time, the Congress was asked to reflect upon the role and needs of women. In order to determine which issues would be raised at the Congress, a pre-Congress Women's Meeting was held two days prior, in order to provide a framework that ensured women's voices and concerns were heard. More than 300 people, 74 percent of whom were women, attended the pre-Congress meeting. This meeting was primarily attended by Ugandan women who set their own agenda, focusing on women's issues such as genital mutilation and the protection of young domestic workers from rape and other abuse. The women participants also moved towards building an agenda for the Pan African Women's Liberation Organisation and met daily during the Congress to discuss the logistics of such a movement. The pre-existing Pan African Women's Organisation primarily consisted of the wives of heads of states, ministers, and other high-ranking women.

In the United States, the term is closely associated with Afrocentrism, an ideology of African-American identity politics that emerged during the civil rights movement of the 1960s to 1970s.

=== 1970s onwards ===
Although Pan-Africanism called for unity between all those of African ancestry, it missed out almost half of these people by overlooking women's contribution. In the book Pan-Africanism History: Political Figures from Africa and the Diaspora since 1787, it mentioned forty Pan-Africanists, of which only three were women. Due to the lack of representation paid to women in Pan- Africanism, Clenora Hudson-Weems coined the term Africana Womanism in the 1980s, which is an ideology that specifically focuses on black women's achievements and gains, similar to the ones mentioned below.

== Important women in pan-Africanism ==
Pan-Africanism has seen the contribution of numerous female African activists throughout its lifespan, despite the systemic lack of attention paid to them by scholars and male pan-Africanists alike.

Amy Jacques Garvey, who founded the international newspaper Negro World, was heavily involved in other Pan-Africanism organisations, such as the anti-colonial and anti-imperialist International African Service Bureau. She also helped organise the Fifth Pan-African Congress. Amy Jacques Garvey used her platform to spread Pan-Africanism globally and used her position as editor for the Negro World to write a column called "Our Women and what they think", dedicated to black women.

Claudia Jones was another pan-Africanist. In order to fight against racism towards black people in the United Kingdom, Jones set up the West Indian Gazette, which sought to cover topics such as the realities of South African apartheid and decolonisation. Notable male Pan-Africanists, such as Kwame Nkrumah, were influenced by Jones as she incorporated Marxist- Leninist philosophy into Pan-Africanism.

In the United States, Audley Moore and Dara Abubakari played a vital role in developing Pan-African thought. These women significantly shaped the ideological and organizational contours of Pan-Africanism, developing a gender-conscious strand of Pan-Africanism that was focused on the realities faced by African-American women, separate from those of African-American men. Both Moore and Abubakari were prominent members of the Universal Association of Ethiopian Women in Louisiana, which engaged in anti-colonial activities, welfare rights, and Pan-Africanist activism. In 1972, Moore was a featured speaker at the All-Africa Women's Conference in Dar es Salaam where she encouraged solidarity among women across the continent and demanded the inclusion of African American women into the conversation, emphasising that they too were committed to liberating Africa.

In the Caribbean, Peggy Antrobus lobbied policymakers to highlight that Caribbean women were the poorest in the Caribbean and that UNICEF was the first international organization to draw attention to the negative impact of structural adjustment on the poor, particularly women.

Alice Victoria Alexander Kinloch was born in 1863 in Cape Town, South Africa, before her family moved to Kimberley. The racist and segregated environment shaped her activism on systemic oppression in South Africa. In June 1885 she married Edmund Ndosa Kinloch, a diamond miner who worked at the De Beers mining compound in Kimberley. She witnessed the degrading working conditions of the compound premised upon the exploitation of black South Africans, such as the practice of making hundreds of black miners attend work naked to ensure diamonds were not being stolen. Kinloch wrote two articles in 1896, after moving to Britain in 1895, for the society named "The Recognition of the Brotherhood of Man", which was well received and earned her high praise from the editors. Her experiences and clear articulation of the South African political situation both through literature and speeches resonated with the British liberal intelligentsia. Kinloch frequently made efforts to engage in dialogue with activist groups in England. She spoke at Newcastle, York and Manchester for the Aborigines Protection Society which led to a resolution being passed that demanded the British government to end racial oppression in South Africa.

Kinloch's detailed accounts of the nature of black oppression in Africa were unprecedented for these organisations who rarely had the opportunity to hear first-hand accounts of the African political situation. Now fully engrossed in the British anti-colonial dialogue, she wrote a 19-page pamphlet on the diamond trade in South Africa in 1897; her views were beginning to take on a distinctly Pan-African character, with calls for an end to continental dehumanization. Kinloch's main contribution to pan-Africanism however was in her co-founding of the African Association in 1897 with lawyers Henry Sylvester Williams and Thomas J. Thompson, where they and 11 or 12 others gathered at the Charing-Cross Mansions hotel in London. Kinloch served as treasurer but in 1898 returned to South Africa with her husband. Two years later, the African Association led the Pan-African Conference, which was widely regarded as the beginning of 20th-century Pan-Africanism. Dr Tshepo Mvulane Moloi calls Kinloch the "founding mother of Pan-Africanism".

Jeanne Martin Cissé was instrumental in the independence of Guinea and in bringing African women's rights to the forefront of the colonial debate, for example influencing Guinea's protection of women's rights enshrined in its constitution. Central to Cissé's work was the idea that the UN could provide an international framework that would protect African girls and women from issues such as forced marriage. In response to rapidly increasing birth rates, while in government, she stressed the importance of family planning and legislated sex education in Guinea's primary schools, despite strong opposition from the Muslim majority population. In an article written in 1979, on the family dynamic in Africa, Cissé makes unprecedented criticisms of the forced role of mothers in brainwashing their daughters to follow prescriptive gender roles. She was also instrumental in the 1968 legislation in Guinea which outlawed polygamy, believing it would effectively combat the widespread abandonment of families by fathers, thus relieving the physical burden mothers faced in Guinea. On the international level, Cissé was the first African president of the United Nations Security Council in 1972 and succeeded in passing two resolutions, condemning Israel's aggression against Palestine, and Apartheid in South Africa. She also drafted and helped pass the UN Convention on Consent and Minimum Age for Marriage in 1964, which provided a wide framework for legislation across Africa.

Funmilayo Ransome-Kuti (FRK) was born in 1900 and studied in England in 1922. She returned to her home town of Abeokuta, in the Ogun state region of Nigeria, where she began her extensive work in Nigerian and international activism. Her achievements were unprecedented: being the first woman with a top-ranking position in a leading political party (the National Council of Nigeria and the Cameroons), the first woman to drive a car in Nigeria, and the first African woman to travel to the Eastern Bloc, visiting China and Russia during the Cold War. Her son, Fela Kuti, became a world-renowned musician and founder of the genre called Afrobeat, a political musical movement that was intensely Pan-African. Scholars who study the life of FRK and her son conclusively agree that she was the main political influence on the Pan-African and political dimension to his music. In 1949, FRK founded and led the Nigerian Women's Union which in 1953 changed its name to the Federation of Nigerian Women's Societies, rallying for inter-regional unity among women's movements in Nigeria. Subsequently, she was courted by international movements for women's rights such as the Women's International Democratic Federation (WIDF) and the Wom'n's International League for Peace and Freedom. She also became embroiled in the politics of Ghana, where she became a friend of the leading African voice on Pan Africanism and president of Ghana, Kwame Nkrumah, who credited her 'with being an inspiration to the Ghana Women's Association.' One of her most notable contributions was the formation of the Abeokuta Ladies Club – this was a collective of Nigerian market women, whose powerful economic position in Abeokuta sought to influence the colonial policy which destroyed their ability to make money and remain independent. By the 1940s, more than 20,000 women had a membership. She changed the name to the Abeokuta Women's Union, marking the movement towards direct activism. For example, in November 1947, she was responsible for organising demonstrations that as many as 10,000 women participated. She continued to organise for women's rights all her life until in 1977, when a government raid conducted in response to her son Fela Kuti's activism, led to her being thrown from a second storey window. She died from her injuries in 1978.

== Pan-Africanism in the 21st century ==
=== Social media and the internet ===
Since the onset of the digital revolution, the internet and other similar media have facilitated the growth of many core pan-African principles by strengthening and increasing connections between people across the diaspora. Although internet penetration rates remain below the world average, roughly 43 percent of the population of Africa uses the internet and social media with Facebook, Twitter and YouTube being among the most popular social networking sites. The ability to connect with people thousands of miles away has allowed these platforms to become places where people across the continent and diaspora have attempted to manufacture a collective African identity. Twitter has been one of the biggest sites where this production is taking place. In July 2015, Botswana satirical writer and speaker Siyanda Mohutsiwa posed a question on her Twitter account that led to the creation of the hashtag #IfAfricaWasABar. After one week, more than 60,000 tweets with the hashtag were created, which allowed users on the platform to grapple with a vision of widespread African interaction throughout the continent. Nigerian artist Burna boy's guiding philosophy is Pan-Africanism, as he firmly believes in rebuilding bridges with the African Diaspora, viewing Africa as the Mother Continent and birthplace of humankind.

The intersection between the digital media revolution and pan-Africanism has also had implications for the education sector. Pan-African organizations have used the internet and digital media to produce educational content for both children and adults in an effort to improve learning outcomes across the continent. The most popular is Ubongo which is Africa's largest manufacturer of educational content for children and uses shows such as Akil and Me to help Africa's youth improve literacy outcomes. The results have been widespread with Ubongo claiming that 24 million children have displayed enhanced learning outcomes and a study in Tanzania finding an association between improved mathematics skills and children consuming Ubongo's content.

=== African Union ===
Pan-African thought influenced the establishment of the Organisation of African Unity (now the African Union) in 1963. One of the biggest goals that the African Union has set for the continent in the 21st century is improving long-term economic growth. Major steps have been taken to address this issue particularly with the creation of the African Continental Free Trade Agreement (AfCFTA). The establishment of this free trade zone connects nations throughout the continent that together have a GDP of upwards of US$2.5 trillion. The emergence of COVID-19 has delayed its implementation but in the long term, the African Union hopes that the agreement will spur industrialization, substantially boost trade, and contribute to increasing economic integration throughout the continent.

The African Union has also sought to make changes on policies involving movement within the continent. Similar to the current agreement in the European Union, the African Union proposed a free movement policy that would allow residents of countries in the union to move throughout the continent freely and participate in economic endeavors in other countries. The majority of countries have not formally signed off on the agreement and others are critical of the prospects of success but the African Union continues to view this policy as a major step toward its goal of continent wide solidarity and integration.

Although in an era of globalization and increased connectivity, challenges continue to persist that undermine the African Union's goal of continent wide solidarity. Many of these challenges have persisted for decades with some including inconsistent treaty implementation, ineffective governance and continued involvement from foreign economic superpowers amongst others. Influence from the United States, the United Kingdom and France continues to remain while new countries such as China are increasingly becoming involved politically and economically on the continent with many referring to this era as a "new scramble for Africa".

== Concept ==
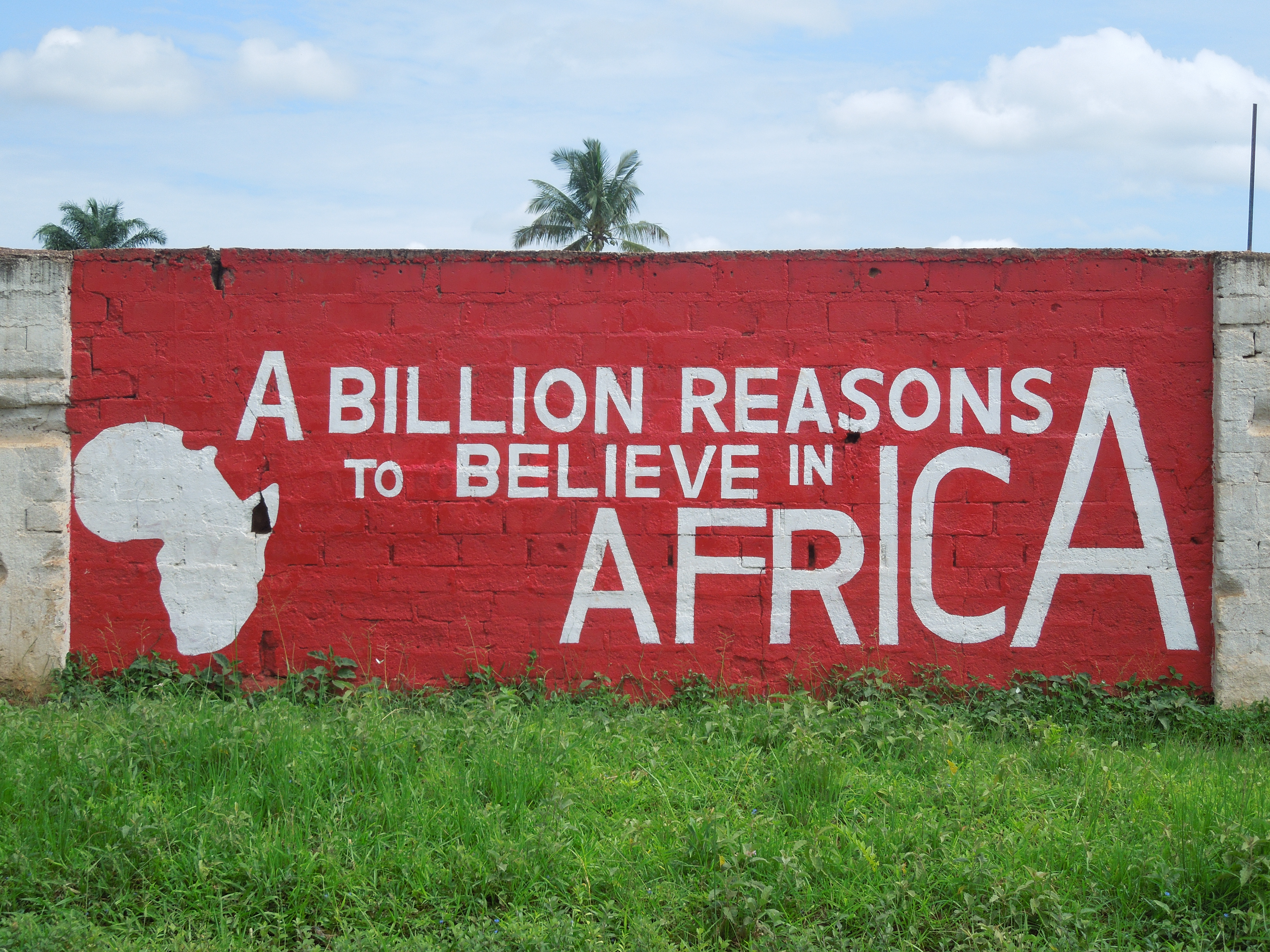
A mural in Ujiji, Tanzania

As originally conceived by Henry Sylvester Williams (although some historians credit the idea to Edward Wilmot Blyden), pan-Africanism referred to the unity of all continental Africa.

During apartheid South Africa there was a Pan Africanist Congress led by Robert Sobukwe that dealt with the oppression of Africans in South Africa under Apartheid rule. Other pan-Africanist organisations include: Garvey's Universal Negro Improvement Association and African Communities League, TransAfrica and the International People's Democratic Uhuru Movement.

Additionally, pan-Africanism is seen as an endeavour to return to what is deemed by its proponents as singular, traditional African concepts about culture, society, and values. Examples of this include Léopold Sédar Senghor's Négritude movement, and Mobutu Sese Seko's view of Authenticité.

An important theme running through much pan-Africanist literature concerns the historical links between different countries on the continent and the benefits of cooperation as a way of resisting imperialism and colonialism.

Some universities went as far as creating "Departments of Pan-African Studies" in the late 1960s. This includes the California State University, where that department was founded in 1969 as a direct reaction to the civil rights movement, and is today dedicated to "teaching students about the African World Experience", to "demonstrate to the campus and the community the richness, vibrance, diversity, and vitality of African, African American, and Caribbean cultures" and to "presenting students and the community with an Afrocentric analysis" of anti-Black racism. Syracuse University also offers a master's degree in Pan African Studies.

== Pan-African colours ==
Flag of Ethiopia, 1897

One of the earliest flags used to represent pan-Africanism is the UNIA (Universal Negro Improvement Association) flag, is a tri-color flag consisting of three equal horizontal bands of (from top-down) red, black and green. The UNIA formally adopted it on August 13, 1920, during its month-long convention at Madison Square Garden in New York.

Variations of the pan-African colours have been applied to create flags in various countries and territories in Africa and the Americas to represent Black Nationalist ideologies. Among these are the flags of Malawi, Kenya, South Sudan and Saint Kitts and Nevis. Several pan-African organizations and movements have also often employed the emblematic red, black and green tri-color scheme in variety of contexts.

Another flag that inspired pan-African groups is the horizontal tricolor of green, yellow and red. This colour combination was originally adopted from the 1897 flag of Ethiopia, and was inspired by the fact that Ethiopia is the continent's oldest independent nation.

== Criticism ==
Pan-Africanism has been accused of being a movement of the African educated bourgeois elite which does not concern itself with the interests of ordinary Africans. Kenyan left-wing journalist Philip Ochieng wrote in 1971,

Nor does it matter if the same masses know anything about the movement. Pan Africanism was a movement of a self-interested class.

Kwame Nkrumah was viewed with suspicion by many of his contemporaries, who regarded him as a "megalomaniac whose only real ambition is to rule the entire African continent". Most newly independent African countries opposed Nkrumah's desires for a politically unified Africa because they viewed it as a threat to their national sovereignty. Ivorian president Félix Houphouët-Boigny was a staunch opponent of Nkrumah, and the two came into conflict with each other.

Pan-Africanist organisations such as the Organization of African Unity have been accused by people such as Tanzanian president Julius Nyerere of being a "committee of dictators" that doesn't protect the rights of Africans. African leaders who served as chairpersons of the Organization of African Unity and the African Union such as Ugandan president Idi Amin, Zimbabwean president Robert Mugabe, and Libyan president Muammar Gaddafi have been accused of severe human rights violations while using Pan-Africanist rhetoric to legitimize their authority. Malawian economist Thandika Mkandawire states,

One major weakness of Pan-Africanism and Africa's regional arrangements has been the failure to protect Africans from their homemade tyrants. Pan-Africanism has not been seen as reinforcing and guaranteeing people's rights as citizens of their respective nations. Solidarity in the name of Pan-Africanism has cast a pall of darkness on horrendous deeds by African dictators from corruption to genocide.

Another criticism of Pan-Africanism is that it is irrelevant for contemporary issues affecting postcolonial Africa, and it is thus "stuck in the past". Pan-Africanism has been accused of placing too much focus on a superficial monolithic "African" or "black" identity while ignoring the complex ethno-religious differences and conflicts that exist among Africans (especially in Nigeria, where independence leaders abandoned national unity after independence in favour of promoting the interests of their own ethnic groups over others), and it has been noted that the ideology relies on constructing a "common foe" such as colonialism in order to maintain its relevance and legitimacy.

== Political parties and organizations ==
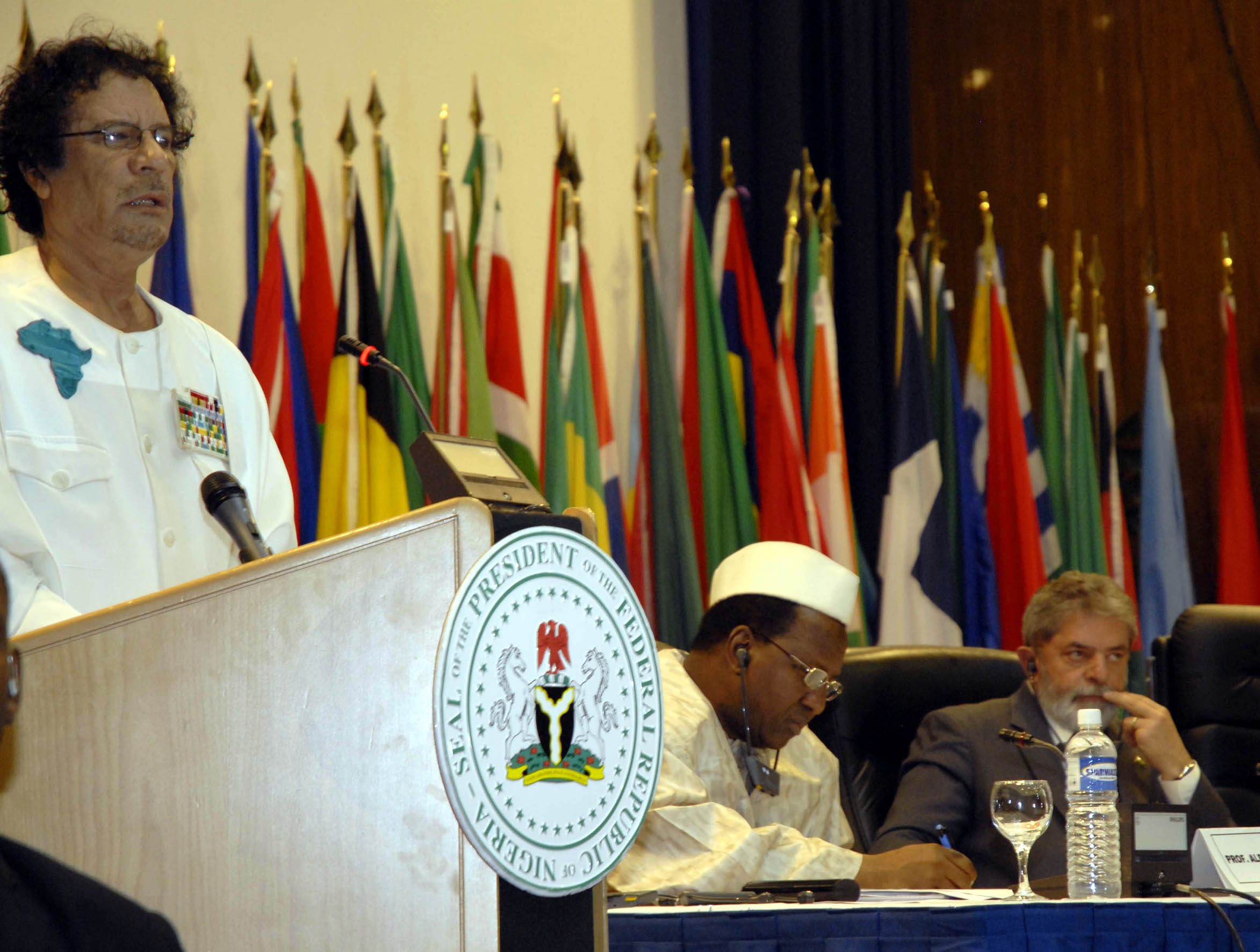
Muammar Gaddafi at the first Africa–South America Summit in 2006 in Abuja, Nigeria

=== In Africa ===
==== Formal political bodies ====
- Organisation of African Unity, succeeded by the African Union
- Pan-African Parliament, African Union

==== Political groups and organizations ====
- African Unification Front
- Rassemblement Démocratique Africain, defunct
- All-African People's Revolutionary Party
- Pan-African Women's Organization
- All Africa Conference of Churches (Kenya)
- All-African Trade Union Federation, defunct
- Convention People's Party (Ghana)
- African National Congress (South Africa)

=== In the Caribbean ===
- The Pan-African Affairs Commission for Pan-African Affairs, a unit within the Office of the Prime Minister of Barbados.
- African Society for Cultural Relations with Independent Africa, defunct (Guyana)
- Antigua Caribbean Liberation Movement (Antigua and Barbuda)
- Clement Payne Movement (Barbados)
- Marcus Garvey People's Political Party (Jamaica)
- Universal Negro Improvement Association and African Communities League (Jamaica)

=== In Europe ===
- Pan-African Federation (United Kingdom), defunct
- Pan-African Women's Association (Norway)

=== In the United States ===
The Council on African Affairs (CAA): founded in 1937 by Max Yergan and Paul Robeson, the CAA was the first major U.S. organization whose focus was on providing pertinent and up-to-date information about Pan-Africanism across the United States, particularly to African Americans. Perhaps the most successful campaign of the council was for South African famine relief in 1946. The CAA was hopeful that, following World War II, there would be a move towards Third World independence under the trusteeship of the United Nations. To the CAA's dismay, the proposals introduced by the U.S. government to the conference in April/May 1945 set no clear limits on the duration of colonialism and no motions towards allowing territorial possessions to move towards self-government.

Liberal supporters abandoned the CAA, and the federal government cracked down on its operations. In 1953, the CAA was charged with subversion under the McCarran Internal Security Act. Its principal leaders, including Robeson, W. E. B. Du Bois, and Alphaeus Hunton (1903–70), were subjected to harassment, indictments, and in the case of Hunton, imprisonment. Under the weight of internal disputes, government repression, and financial hardships, the Council on African Affairs disbanded in 1955.

- The US Organization was founded in 1965 by Maulana Karenga, following the Watts riots. It is based on the synthetic African philosophy of kawaida, and is perhaps best known for creating Kwanzaa and the Nguzo Saba ("seven principles"). In the words of its founder and chair, Karenga, "the essential task of our organization Us has been and remains to provide a philosophy, a set of principles and a program which inspires a personal and social practice that not only satisfies human need but transforms people in the process, making them self-conscious agents of their own life and liberation".
- TransAfrica is a non-profit organization founded in 1977 by Randall Robinson that strives to provide political and economic aid to those of African diaspora groups. The social justice group raises awareness of diasporan happenings through legal action and educating Afro-descendants on the domestic and foreign policy of the United States that directly affect them. By creating more engagement between Africans and people of African ancestry to policymakers, TransAfrica seeks to create more sustainable, independent, and progressive development for these ethnic groups.

== Pan-African concepts and philosophies ==
=== Maafa studies ===
Maafa is an aspect of Pan-African studies. The term collectively refers to 500 years of suffering (including the present) of people of African heritage through slavery, imperialism, colonialism, and other forms of oppression. In this area of study, both the actual history and the legacy of that history are studied as a single discourse. The emphasis in the historical narrative is on African agents, as opposed to non-African agents.

=== Afrocentric Pan-Africanism ===
Afrocentric Pan-Africanism is espoused by Kwabena Faheem Ashanti in his book The Psychotechnology of Brainwashing: Crucifying Willie Lynch. Another newer movement that has evolved from the early Afrocentric school is the Afrisecal movement or Afrisecaism of Francis Ohanyido, a Nigerian philosopher-poet. Black nationalism is sometimes associated with this form of Pan-Africanism.

=== Kawaida ===
Kawaida, a Swahili word meaning "usually", is a Pan-Africanist nationalist and academic movement that was created during the height of the Black Power movement by Africana professor, author, and activist Maulana Karenga. The philosophy encourages the reclamation of traditional African thought with the belief it will empower Afro-descendants to sustain their fight against racism and other fundamental issues.

=== Hip-hop ===
Since the late 1970s, hip hop has emerged as a powerful force that has partly shaped black identity worldwide. In his 2005 article "Hip-hop Turns 30: Whatcha Celebratin' For?", Greg Tate describes hip-hop culture as the product of a Pan-African state of mind. It is an "ethnic enclave/empowerment zone that has served as a foothold for the poorest among us to get a grip on the land of the prosperous".

Hip-hop unifies those of African descent globally in its movement towards greater economic, social and political power. Andreana Clay in her article "Keepin' it Real: Black Youth, Hip-Hop Culture, and Black Identity" states that hip-hop provides the world with "vivid illustrations of Black lived experience", creating bonds of black identity across the globe. From a Pan-African perspective, hip-hop culture can be a conduit to authenticate a black identity, and in doing so, creates a unifying and uplifting force among Africans that Pan-Africanism sets out to achieve.

An expansion in the popularity of hip-hop culture in the 21st century has also increased the role hip-hop is playing for Pan-African solidarity across the diaspora although the opportunity for a greater Pan-African involvement remains. At a conference at Howard University on March 4, 2016, Assistant Professor of African Studies Msia K. Clark spoke of the historical connection that has linked Pan-Africanism and hip-hop since the genre's birth and how hip-hop culture has been at the forefront of various movements throughout the continent in the 21st century. One of these movements involved Y'en a Marre, which was a collection of mainly Senegalese rap artists that are attributed with helping to remove former President Abdoulaye Wade from office in 2012 through the mass electoral mobilization of Senegal's youth.

== Pan-African art and media ==
- Les Afriques, a weekly African financial newspaper, is the first Pan-African financial newspaper.

== See also ==
- Pan-Africanism in Kenya
- African diaspora
- African nationalism
- Africana womanism
- Afro-Asia
- Afro-futurism
- Afro-pessimism
- Black nationalism
- Négritude
- Pan-Arabism
- Pan-Semitism
- United States of Africa
- List of conflicts in Africa
- List of ethnic groups of Africa
- Languages of Africa
- Religion in Africa

General:

- Pan-nationalism
- List of topics related to the African diaspora

== Bibliography ==
- Kemi Séba, Philosophie de la panafricanité fondamentale – Édition Fiat Lux, 2023 ISBN 9791091157391
- Hakim Adi, Pan-Africanism: A History. London: Bloomsbury, 2018
- Hakim Adi & Marika Sherwood, Pan-African History: Political Figures from Africa and the Diaspora Since 1787, London: Routledge, 2003
- Wendell Nii Laryea Adjetey, Cross-Border Cosmopolitans: The Making of a Pan-African North America, Chapel Hill: University of North Carolina Press, 2023, ISBN 978-1-4696-6992-2
- Imanuel Geiss, Panafrikanismus. Zur Geschichte der Dekolonisation. Habilitation, EVA, Frankfurt am Main, 1968, English as: The Pan-African Movement, London: Methuen, 1974, ISBN 0-416-16710-1, and as: The Pan-African Movement. A history of Pan-Africanism in America, Europe and Africa, New York: Africana Publ., 1974, ISBN 0-8419-0161-9
- Blain N. Keisha, Asia Leeds, and Ula Y. Taylor, Women, Gender Politics and Pan-Africanism, Vol. 4, Issue 2 (Fall 2016), pp. 139–145
- Colin Legum, Pan-Africanism: A Short Political Guide, revised edition, New York: Frederick A. Praeger, 1965
- Tony Martin, Pan-African Connection: From Slavery to Garvey and Beyond, Dover: The Majority Press, 1985
- Willie Molesi, Black Africa versus Arab North Africa: The Great Divide, ISBN 979-8332308994
- Willie Molesi, Relations Between Africans and Arabs: Harsh Realities, ISBN 979-8334767546
