= Doreen Kessy =

Tanzanian entrepreneur

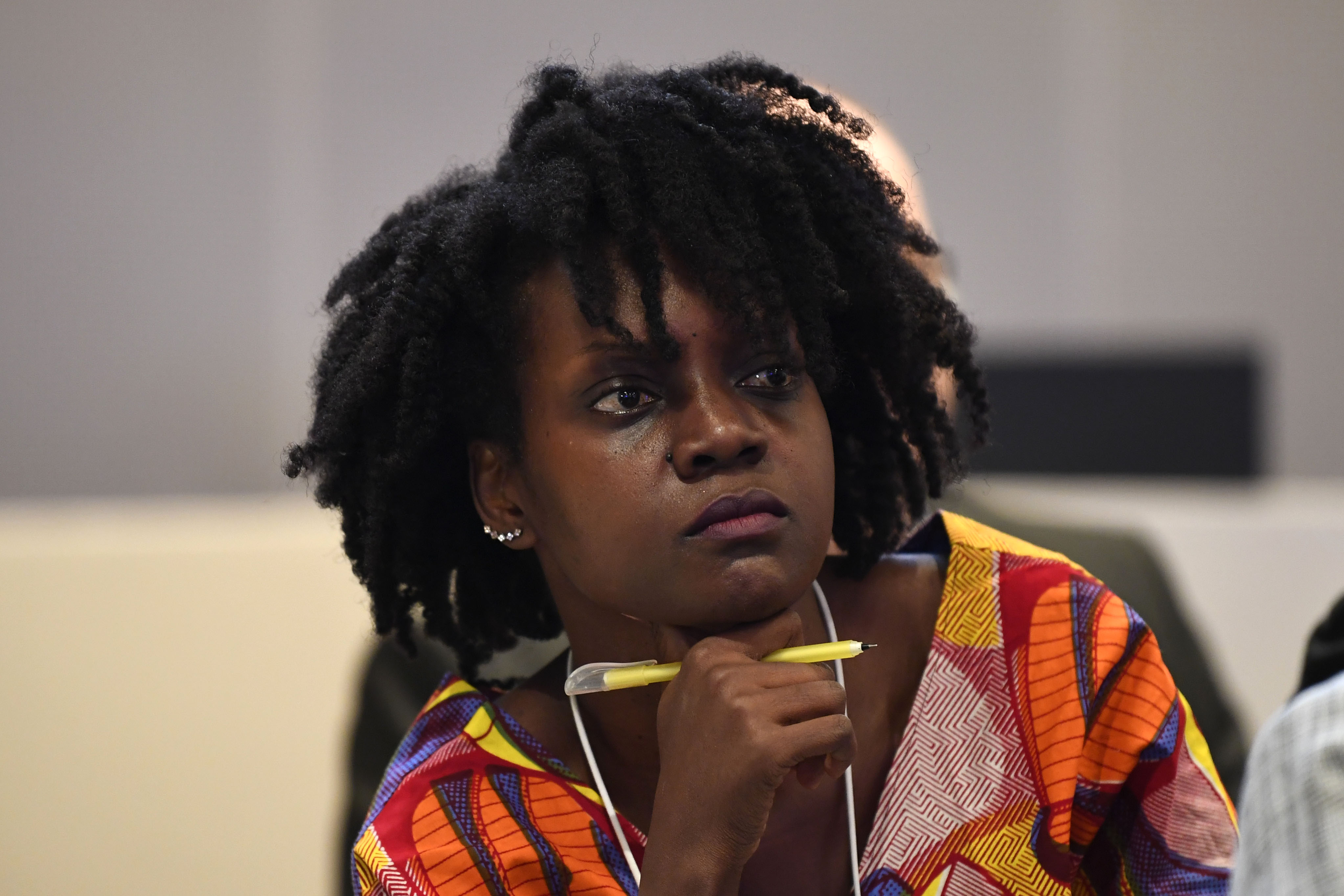
- Kessy at the World Economic Forum Annual Meeting in Davos
- Education: Australian Studies Institute in Nairobi, Kenya
- Alma mater: Liberty University, Virginia
- Occupation: Founder of Eden Retreat
- Website: www.edenretreat.co

Doreen Kessy is a Tanzanian entrepreneur and a champion for quality education for kids in Africa. She is the founder of Eden Retreat, a bespoke wellness travel experience company designed to recharge and realign busy and burned-out professionals. They curate transformational corporate retreats and group retreats for professionals in cities around the world. Doreen is also the former Chief Business Officer and Chief Operations Officer at Ubongo Learning Ltd, Africa's leading children's edutainment and media company. She is also the founder and director of Helpers of Hope, a non-profit organization that empowers rural communities for Christ.

Kessy played a critical role in building Ubongo to help kids learn and love learning through mass media technologies such as TV, radio and mobile phone. Over the year, she led Ubongo's operations, most importantly its commercial strategy, market expansion efforts across Africa, and language adaption and content distribution.

It is estimated that over 30 million family households in 41 countries in Africa watch and learn from Ubongo cartoons every week.

== Education and career ==
Kessy received a master's degree in Business Administration and a bachelor's degree in International Business and Economics from Liberty University in Virginia. Prior to Ubongo, Kessy worked with a variety of organizations including International Justice Mission, Wells Fargo and Smile Africa, and she designed poverty relief programs implemented in Zimbabwe and Zambia.

== Activism ==
Ubongo teaches math and science through animated stories and songs. Kessy also provides the English voice of one of the characters in the Ubongo animated material, a monkey named Ngedere.

== Awards ==
On 10 October 2018, Kessy was among eight innovators who were awarded with African Union Education Innovation Prizes. The Innovating in Education Africa Expo 2018 took place in Dakar, Senegal.

== See also ==
- Irene Tarimo
- Mary Mgonja
- Joyce Msuya
- Frannie Leautier
- Elizabeth Mrema
