= Pan-Africanism in Kenya =

Ideology calling for the unity of Africa

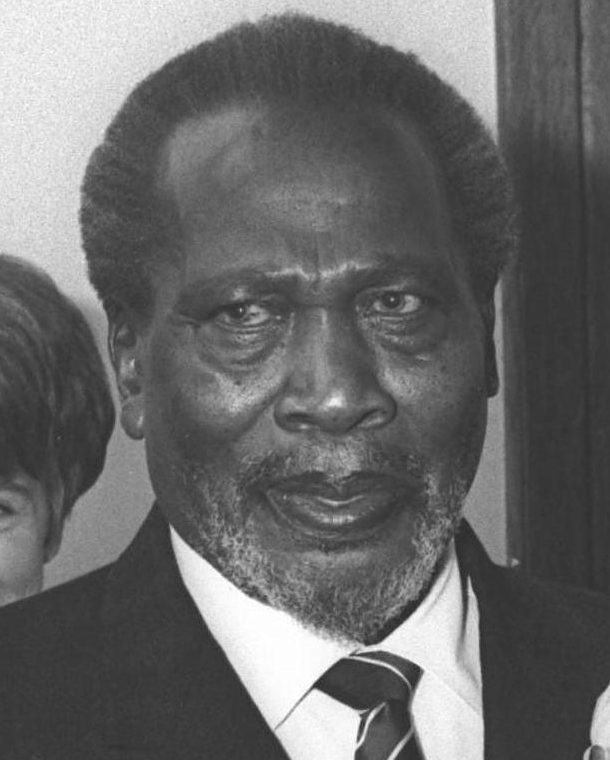
Jomo Kenyatta, first leader of the Kenyan Republic, and important face of Pan-Africa.

Pan-Africanism is a cultural and political ideology calling for the unification of the various African communities and their diasporic counterparts for the purpose of empowering each other. The goal originally held by The First Pan-African Congress and future gatherings throughout the early 1900s was of progressive African self-government rather than strict independence. By 1944 however the Pan-African Federation called for full independence of African states from European colonization.

The heights of the movement were primarily characterized in the west by the Black nationalist struggles of Marcus Garvey, and the push for greater self determination by W.E.B Du Bois during the early twentieth century. The literature is much vaster once one leaves the western world and enters the African continent, where one can find a consistent effort in much of the territory to unify themselves against the common enemy of Imperialism. Pan-Africanism's influence can be characterized through its contributions to art, media, and politics.

== Colonialism context ==
Like much of the African continent, Kenya was colonized by the European "scramble for Africa". Specifically, the British Empire viewed Kenya as desirable and colonized the area in the late 1800s due to its geographical location which gave access to Uganda, Buganda and Bunyoro, had many natural resources, and viable farmland suitable for farming cash crops.

=== Pan-Africanism‌ ‌in‌ ‌Kenya‌ ‌before‌ ‌Jomo‌ ‌Kenyatta‌ ===
Harry Thuku was a prominent speaker born in the Kikuyu region of Kenya whose prominence can be traced all the way back to the 1910s. He worked with Ugandans and other Africans to expand their strength and expose the unfair economic and social conditions levied onto them by Britain. Harry Thuku proved himself a pioneer of pushing for African-Asian alliances with his positions on Indian migration within the still colonial Kenyan.

== Jomo Kenyatta ==
Jomo Kenyatta, who led Kenya into independence and the nation's first experiment with democracy. Despite Pan-Africanism in Kenya, dating back to the 1920s with Harry Thuku, it was Kenyatta who would actualize the movement's real potential in Kenya.

=== Jomo Kenyatta's role in bringing Kenyan independence ===
Jomo Kenyatta, born Kamau Ngeni, was born in the Gatundu Division of Kiambu in 1889 to the Kikuyu tribe. Kenyatta was introduced to Kenyan politics by way of his occupation at the Nairobi City Council from 1921 to 1926. In 1925, he was elected as a representative of the Kikuyu region when they were dealing with land problems created by the Hilton Young Commission.

In 1928, he helped publish the Muigwithania, meaning “the reconciler”, which was used secondarily to promote Kikuyu culture, but the newspaper pushed the idea of the “common good” and focused on reconciling the differences between the tribes; this Pan-African ethnic would later translate into his political career following independence. For most of the 1930s, Kenyatta would spend some time in England, studying economics, petitioning African grievances to parliament, and teaching the indigenous language.

In 1945, Jomo Kenyatta took part in the Pan-African Fifth Congress where he would become introduced to other prominent Pan-Africanists like Kwame Nkrumah. Following his return to the Kikuyu region in 1946, he would demonstrate his commitment to Pan-Africanism with his third marriage. He believed in breaking down tribal barriers and believed polygamy could gain him political power.

== Kenyatta's Pan-African philosophies ==
Kenyatta's philosophy on Pan-Africanism followed two traditions, that of the elder tradition and that of the warrior tradition.

=== Elder tradition ===
The Elder tradition took politics from the bureaucratic model implanted into colonies back to the “heavily paternalistic” roots that characterized precolonial African politics. He believed that eliminating all vestiges of the tribe would be impossible and could possibly result in a rejection of his authority by the political elites. This translated into his prime minister administration as not just an executive figurehead that works with the Kenyan Parliament, but a father figure of the greater “tribe” of Kenya. This involved withdrawing “from involvement in the affairs of the nation and dominate the scene from a godlike position in the background”. This all culminated in a Pan-Africa that could transition into nation-statehood with ease by relying upon symbols familiar to more traditional political structures.

=== Warrior tradition ===
The warrior tradition complimented and supplemented the Elder tradition insofar as both traditions aimed at suppressing the influence of western structures that was implanted during colonization, but also moved with a familiarity of preexisting political symbols and cultures. This tradition is one of active militant aggression that characterize the political culture of African politics. This tradition predates Kenyatta as scholars believe that “early-armed challenges by Africans against colonial rule as the very origins of modern nationalism in the continent”. Kenyatta injected this idea into the Kenyan political sphere when handling the Mau Mau soldiers and transforming them from a renegade militia to protectors of the “Elder”. This tradition is characterized by a strong Pan-African ethic of self reliance that can be seen even into modern day Kenyan politics.

== Jomo Kenyatta's legacy as a father of Pan-Africanism ==
Kenyatta was a father of Pan-Africa, but he stood out greatly from his peers. He would more accurately be characterized as a conservative Pan-African. He greatly relied upon ancestral and traditional symbols to rally, consolidate, and mobilize the Kenyan population. He kept much of the bureaucratic models of governance that existed and utilized the aforementioned symbols to give his political regimes legitimacy. His leadership of Kenya would serve as a symbolic chiefdom to the point that his son currently holds the mantle as his successor in the political sphere. Furthermore, while his regime would become characterized as authoritarian in nature, the economy was left relatively free. Kenya remained a mostly capitalist nation, which was controversial at the time in the African world.

In contrast to most of his contemporaries, he desired to maintain individual politics within a Pan-African spirit, rather than a political union. Kenyatta heavily disagreed with his contemporary Kwame Nkrumah, who believed that a unified Africa must extend to the political realm by way of political assimilation into a Marxist regime. Kenyatta never disagreed with Nkrumah's desire for an anti-imperialist Africa, but understood that there was a latent difficulty in creating unity through nationhood after spending most of his life trying to instill this idea into Kenyan community. Creating unity through continental nation hood would be an undertaking that might be an impossibility.

=== Recent Pan-African Congress and its implications ===
Pan-Africa in Kenya has been mostly felt through the population's loyalty to the state and the constant push against tribalism, especially amongst the younger generation. There is an increasingly political dialogue occurring in the international world. The recent Pan-African congress that was held in Ghana spent much of its time chastising Kenya for its unwillingness to cooperate with the "road map unanimously adopted at the emergency meeting of the Governing Council (GC) and International Preparatory Committee (IPC)". The road map includes a three step process of integrating the African nations into one African state and integrating the diasporadic African peoples into it. Kenya still remains one of the Pan-African centers of the world, but their desire to remain sovereign has limited aspirations of a politically united Pan-Africa.
