= Inboekstelsel =

Form of child labour in the Dutch Cape Colony and later Boer republics

Inboekelinge child labour was instituted by Dutch settlers in the Dutch Cape Colony and by their descendants in the Boer republics. The word is derived from the Dutch verb inboeken (register; literally "in-book"), referring to the requirement of entering the names and details of the inboekeling (also spelled inboekseling), or apprentices, in the Landdros's register. It is widely seen as a form of child slavery by historians of South Africa.

The system had its origin in the Cape Northern Frontier during the second half of the 18th century, when Dutch settlers would capture Tswana, Pedi, Venda, Ndebele, Khoikhoi and San children before enslaving them until adulthood. When the Voortrekkers migrated into the Transvaal during the 1840s, they brought the inboekstelsel system with them. Inboekelinge children were captured during raids, or handed over as apprentices by their conquered parents in return for land or goods. In some cases, they were sold by Dutch settlers and their descendants to other burghers, in what became known as the trade in "black ivory".

In the Transvaal, the inboekelings numbered about 4,000 in 1866, nearly one for every ten settlers. In 1869, the synod of the Dutch Reformed Church adopted a resolution condemning the practice, but rescinded it two years later on the grounds that the system no longer existed. In the Transvaal, legislation required that males be released from indenture at the age of 25, while females were released at 21, but the law was not always observed in remote frontier districts.

British attitudes towards the Inboekstelsel system were ambivalent. The British administration of the Transvaal between 1877 and 1881 did not affect it.

Historians, like Elizabeth Eldredge and Fred Morton, have argued that Inboekstelsel was a system of child slavery. Although legal slavery was abolished in the Cape Colony in 1834 by the British Empire, the inboekstelling system allowed the descendants of Dutch settlers to continue practicing forced labour in the Boer republics after the Great Trek.

== See also ==
- Griqua people
- Restavec, a similar system in modern Haiti
- Slavery in South Africa
