= Ubongo Learning =

Tanzanian children's media company

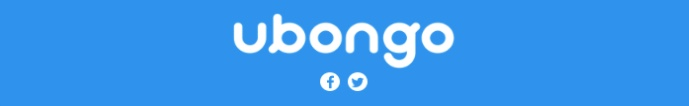
Ubongo's logo

Ubongo is a social enterprise based in Dar es Salaam, Tanzania, that creates edutainment and educational children's television series in Africa. They produce two shows: Ubongo Kids, for 7–12 year olds, and Akili and Me, for 3–6 year olds. In the five years since the first episode of Ubongo Kids aired, Ubongo's shows have become relatively popular in Africa, receiving 11 million viewers a week in nine different African countries.

Ubongo creates localized, multi-platform Entertainment-Education for school-age children and their parents in Africa. The company's content improves school readiness, learning outcomes, and promote social and behavioral change for children, caregivers and educators.

== Shows ==
=== Akili and Me ===
Akili and Me is Ubongo's early childhood development cartoon series targeted at 0–5 year olds and their caregivers. The series centers on the life of a curious 4-year-old named Akili, who lives with her family at the foot of Mt. Kilimanjaro in Tanzania. Every night when she falls asleep, she enters the magical world of Lala Land, where she and her animal friends learn all about language, letters, numbers and art, while developing kindness and coming to grips with their emotions and rapidly changing toddler lives. Akili and Me is broadcast in seven countries and has a significant international online following through YouTube with over 100,000 subscribers. The show is targeted for children aged 0–5 to focus on pre-literacy skills and socio-emotional learning outcomes.

Akili and Me has five educational segments each episode: counting/numeracy, English as a second language, a socio-emotional development objective, health/nutrition, and learning the alphabet in whichever language the episode has been dubbed in.

=== Ubongo Kids ===
Ubongo Kids is a kids' educational cartoon targeted at children from ages 7–12 that follows the problem-solving adventures of the Ubongo Kids: five friends who love learning science, technology, engineering, math (STEM), and life skills. They use their new knowledge to solve problems and mysteries in Kokotoa Village. The show has progressed from being Tanzania's first homegrown cartoon to a Pan-African series on TV in 4 languages and 55 African countries and territories.

== History ==
=== Background: Education in Africa ===
According to UNESCO, most of the 440 million kids in Africa do not receive a quality education. Sub-Saharan Africa has the highest rates of education exclusion in the world. Despite being the region with the fastest growing school-age population, "more than 70% of countries face teacher shortages in primary schools, while 90% do not have enough secondary teachers".

Over one-fifth of children between the ages of 6–11 are out of school and one-third of youth between the ages of 12–14 are out of school. Almost 60% of youth between the ages of 15–17 are not in school.

According to Harvard professor and education researcher Dana Charles McCoy, the problem starts in early childhood, with 44% of children aged 3–4 in Africa experiencing low cognitive and social emotional development. As a result, many enter school with insufficient learning readiness. According to the Brookings Institution, "less than 7 percent of students in late primary school are proficient in reading, against 14 percent in mathematics." In Tanzania, 55% of 10–16 year olds fail baseline math and reading tests set for an 8 year old, and over half of primary students do not own a single text book. The State of Education in Africa Report 2015 states, "The power of effective teaching can transform children for the rest of their lives. However a severe shortage of trained teachers is a stark reality." In Tanzania, the rate of teacher absenteeism is 24%. This leads to many children attending school but not learning.

Almost half of Africa's population are children, and 2 billion more will be born in the next 35 years. Ubongo claims that its aim is to "fill this gap at low cost and massive scale to help Africa's next generation realize their full potential."

=== Origins ===
Ubongo was founded by Nisha Ligon, Rajab Semtawa, Cleng'a Ng'atigwa, Tom Ng'atigwa and Arnold Minde.

== Languages ==
Ubongo broadcasts its children's cartoons and radio content in Swahili, English, French and Kinyarwanda.

== Impact ==
According to research and program evaluations, watching Ubongo's educational cartoons leads to improved learning outcomes for children. Tanzanian kids aged 3–6 who watch Akili and Me outperform non-viewers by 24% in counting, 12% in number recognition, 10% in shape recognition, 13% in English language and 8% in fine motor skills when accounting for age, gender, socio-economic status, and baseline knowledge.

Eleven million families in Africa watch Ubongo shows every month. Many of Ubongo's viewers also follow their YouTube channels.

== Countries ==
Ubongo's shows are available on Free to Air TV in: Ghana, Kenya, Malawi, Nigeria, Rwanda, South Africa, Tanzania, Uganda, and Zambia.

== Notable people ==
- Doreen Kessy

== See also ==
- Education in Africa
- Educational technology in sub-Saharan Africa
- Social and behavior change communication
- Early childhood

== Works cited ==
- McCoy, Dana Charles et al, "Early Childhood Developmental Status in Low- and Middle-Income Countries: National, Regional, and Global Prevalence Estimates Using Predictive Modeling"
- Borzekowski, Dina L.G, "A quasi-experiment examining the impact of educational cartoons on Tanzanian children". Journal of Applied Developmental Psychology, Issue 54. January 2017.
