= Mary Mgonja =

Tanzanian agricultural scientist

Doctor Mary Mgonja
- Born: Pare highlands, Tanzania
- Occupations: Agricultural Scientist, Plant breeder, Entrepreneur
- Years active: Mid-1970s-Present
- Board member of: Southern African Development Community, East African Community, Africa Seeds Organization, Tanzania Association for Professional Women in Agriculture and Environment
- Children: 2

Academic background
- Education: University of Dar es Salaam, University of Arkansas, University of Ibadan (Doctor of Philosophy in Plant Breeding, 1990), North Dakota State University, International Development Research Centre

Academic work
- Institutions: International Crops Research Institute for the Semi-Arid Tropics, Alliance for a Green Revolution in Africa
- Website: https://namburiseeds.co.tz/

Mary Mgonja is a Tanzanian agricultural scientist, plant breeder and entrepreneur. She is the co-founder and Agricultural Scientists of Namburi Agricultural Company Limited.

== Background and education ==
Mgonja was born in Tanzania, where she grew up and attended school. She relocated to the United States of America to obtain a master's degree at the University of Arkansas. She then obtained a Doctor of Philosophy in plant breeding and plant genetics, jointly obtained from the University of Ibadan and from the International Institute of Tropical Agriculture, also located in Ibadan, Nigeria.

== Career ==
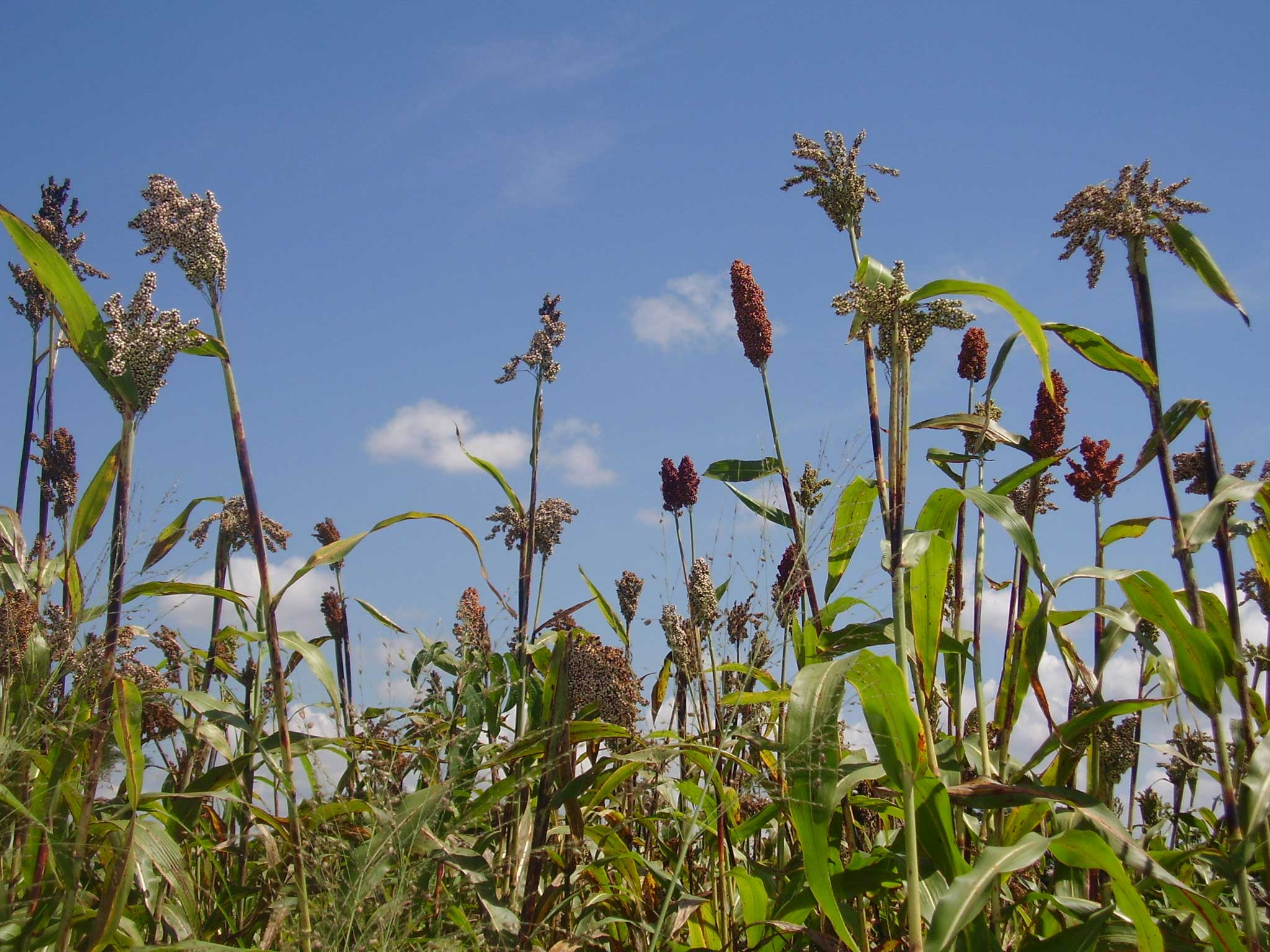
Sorghum plants ready for harvest

Prior to her starting her own business, Mjonga worked as a principal scientist on the improvement of dryland cereals, at the International Crops Research Institute for the Semi-Arid Tropics, based in Patancheru, Hyderabad, Telangana, India.

She also represented Tanzania in crop networks in the Southern African Development Community (SADC) and in the East African Community (EAC). From 2014 to 2016, Mgonja also served as the country director of the Alliance for a Green Revolution in Africa (AGRA), an organisation that is supported by the Bill and Melinda Gates Foundation and the Rockefeller Foundation and aims to improve agricultural output and products by supporting local farmers and farm workers. In her capacity as country director, Mgonja advocated for increased adoption of technology in agriculture to boost output, produce surplus products for the market and increase food security.

In 2017, Mgonja joined the ten-person governing board of the Africa Seeds Organization, an inter-government agency within the African Union, which is responsible for implementing the African Seed and Biotechnology Programme.

Starting in 2016, Mgonja has developed hybrids of sorghum and maize plants, focusing on drought tolerance and improved productivity for sale to farmers. Her hybrids are now in use by over 46,000 farmers and are credited with improving food security, economic stability, and Climate resilience. Her seeds are licensed through public-private partnerships and sold through local seed companies, cutting out shipping and import costs.

== Awards ==
Mgonja has received multiple awards for Excellence from the Prime Minister of Tanzania.

== Publications ==
- Muturi, Phyllis; Mgonja, Mary; Rubaihayo, Patrick; Mwololo, James (2021). "QTL Mapping of Traits Associated with Dual Resistance to the African Stem Borer (Busseola fusca) and Spotted Stem Borer (Chilo partellus) in Sorghum (Sorghum bicolor)". International Journal of Genomics: 1–17. doi:10.1155/2021/7016712. PMC 7834829. PMID 33532486.
- Mgonja, Mary; Lenné, J; Manyasa, E; Sreenivasaprasad, S (2007). Finger millet blast management in East Africa Creating opportunities for improving production and utilization of finger millet. Kenya: International Crops Research Institute for the Semi-Arid Tropics. ISBN 9789290665052.
