= Fires Prevention Act 1838 =

Act of the Parliament of the United Kingdom

Fires Prevention Act 1838 (Note: The citation of this act by this short title was authorised by section 5 of, and the second schedule to, the Statute Law Revision Act 1948. Due to the repeal of those provisions, it is now authorised by section 19(2) of the Interpretation Act 1978.)
- Act of Parliament
- Parliament of the United Kingdom
- Long title: An Act to amend so much of the Fires Prevention (Metropolis) Act, 1785, as relates to Manufactories of Pitch, Tar and Turpentine. (Note: These words are printed against this act in the second column of the second schedule to the Statute Law Revision Act 1948, which is headed "Title".)
- Citation: 1 & 2 Vict. c. 75
- Territorial extent: United Kingdom

Dates
- Royal assent: 10 August 1838
- Commencement: 10 August 1838 (Note: The Acts of Parliament (Commencement) Act 1793.)
- Repealed: 1 January 1968
Other legislation
Amends	Fires Prevention Act 1785
Amended by	Statute Law Revision Act 1874 (No. 2)
Repealed by	Criminal Law Act 1967
Relates to	Fires Prevention (Metropolis) Act 1774; Metropolitan Buildings Act 1844

Status: Repealed

Text of statute as originally enacted

The Fires Prevention Act 1838 or the Fires Prevention (Metropolis) Act 1838 (Note: The citation of this act by this short title was authorised by section 1 of, and the first schedule to, the Short Titles Act 1896. Due to the repeal of those provisions it is now authorised by section 19(2) of the Interpretation Act 1978.) (1 & 2 Vict. c. 75) was an act of the Parliament of the United Kingdom. It amended the provisions of the Fires Prevention Act 1785 (25 Geo. 3. c. 77), which related to manufactories of tar, pitch and turpentine, by enacting that the penalty of £100 inflicted to the owners or occupiers of such buildings by that act would only be applied when the building was within 75 feet of another building. If the adjacent building was occupied by the same tenant, and the whole premises were more than 75 feet from any other building, the penalty would not apply. It also established that no person would be liable for any penalties under that act until January 1839, with proprietors or occupiers of such buildings remaining exempt until August 1840.

== Subsequent developments ==
The whole act, so far as unrepealed, was repealed by section 13(2) of, and part II of schedule 4 to, the Criminal Law Act 1967, which came into force on 21 July 1967.
