= Fires Prevention Act 1785 =

Act of the Parliament of Great Britain

Fires Prevention Act 1785 (Note: The citation of this act by this short title was authorised by section 5 of, and the second schedule to, the Statute Law Revision Act 1948. Due to the repeal of those provisions, it is now authorised by section 19(2) of the Interpretation Act 1978.)
- Act of Parliament
- Parliament of Great Britain
- Long title: An Act to amend so much of the Fires Prevention (Metropolis) Act, 1774, as relates to Manufactories of Turpentine: for extending the provisions of the said Act, so amended, to Manufactories of Pitch, Tar and Turpentine, throughout that part of Great Britain called England; (Note: These words are printed against this act in the second column of the second schedule to the Statute Law Revision Act 1948, which is headed "Title".) [and for indemnifying the Proprietor of a Turpentine Manufactory in Potter's Fields in the Borough of Southwark, against the Penalties he may be liable to under the said Act; and for excepting, for a limited Time, his said Manufactory from the Provisions herein contained. (Note: This part of the short title was repealed by the Statute Law Revision Act 1887 (50 & 51 Vict. c. 59).)
- Citation: 25 Geo. 3. c. 77
- Territorial extent: Great Britain

Dates
- Royal assent: 20 July 1785
- Commencement: 5 July 1785 (Note: Section 1.)
- Repealed: 1 January 1968

Other legislation
- Amends: Fires Prevention (Metropolis) Act 1774
- Amended by: Fires Prevention Act 1838; Limitations of Actions and Costs Act 1842; Statute Law Revision Act 1871; Statute Law Revision Act 1887; Statute Law Revision Act 1888; Statute Law Revision Act 1948
- Repealed by: Criminal Law Act 1967

Status: Repealed

Text of statute as originally enacted

The Fires Prevention Act 1785 or the Fires Prevention (Metropolis) Act 1785 (Note: The citation of this act by this short title was authorised by section 1 of, and the first schedule to, the Short Titles Act 1896. Due to the repeal of those provisions it is now authorised by section 19(2) of the Interpretation Act 1978.) (25 Geo. 3. c. 77) was an act of the Parliament of Great Britain.

== Subsequent developments ==
This act was partly repealed by section 2 of the Limitations of Actions and Costs Act 1842 (5 & 6 Vict. c. 97).

Sections 3 and 4 of the act were repealed by section 1 of, and the schedule to, the Statute Law Revision Act 1871 (34 & 35 Vict. c. 116), which came into force on 21 August 1871.

The following enactments were repealed by section 1 of, and the schedule to, the Statute Law Revision Act 1887 (50 & 51 Vict. c. 59), which came into force on 16 September 1887.:

- The title from "and for indemnifying" to the end of the title
- Preamble

Section 1 from the beginning of the section to "repealed and that", and from "of debt" to "information" and from "at Westminster" to "allowed"

- Section 6

Section 5 of the act, from "be it" to "enacted that" was repealed by section 1(1) of, and part I of the schedule to, the Statute Law Revision Act 1888 (51 & 52 Vict. c. 3), which came into force on 27 March 1888.

The words of commencement in section 1 of the act were repealed by section 1 of, and the first schedule to, the Statute Law Revision Act 1948 (11 & 12 Geo. 6. c. 62), which came into force on 30 July 1948.

The whole act, so far as unrepealed, was repealed by section 13(2) of, and part I of schedule 4 of the Criminal Law Act 1967, which came into force on 1 January 1968.
