= List of acts of the Parliament of Great Britain from 1785 =

This is a complete list of acts of the Parliament of Great Britain for the year 1785.

For acts passed until 1707, see the list of acts of the Parliament of England and the list of acts of the Parliament of Scotland. See also the list of acts of the Parliament of Ireland.

For acts passed from 1801 onwards, see the list of acts of the Parliament of the United Kingdom. For acts of the devolved parliaments and assemblies in the United Kingdom, see the list of acts of the Scottish Parliament, the list of acts of the Northern Ireland Assembly, and the list of acts and measures of Senedd Cymru; see also the list of acts of the Parliament of Northern Ireland.

The number shown after each act's title is its chapter number. Acts are cited using this number, preceded by the year(s) of the reign during which the relevant parliamentary session was held; thus the Union with Ireland Act 1800 is cited as "39 & 40 Geo. 3. c. 67", meaning the 67th act passed during the session that started in the 39th year of the reign of George III and which finished in the 40th year of that reign. Note that the modern convention is to use Arabic numerals in citations (thus "41 Geo. 3" rather than "41 Geo. III"). Acts of the last session of the Parliament of Great Britain and the first session of the Parliament of the United Kingdom are both cited as "41 Geo. 3".

Acts passed by the Parliament of Great Britain did not have a short title; however, some of these acts have subsequently been given a short title by acts of the Parliament of the United Kingdom (such as the Short Titles Act 1896).

Before the Acts of Parliament (Commencement) Act 1793 came into force on 8 April 1793, acts passed by the Parliament of Great Britain were deemed to have come into effect on the first day of the session in which they were passed. Because of this, the years given in the list below may in fact be the year before a particular act was passed.

== 25 Geo. 3 ==
The second session of the 16th Parliament of Great Britain, which met from 25 January 1785 until 27 October 1785.

This session was also traditionally cited as 25 G. 3.

=== Public acts ===
| Short title | Citation | Royal assent |
Long title
| Trade Act 1785 (repealed) | 25 Geo. 3. c. 1 | 8 March 1785 |
An Act for confining for a limited Time the Trade between the Ports of the United States of America and His Majesty's Subjects in the Island of Newfoundland, to Bread, Flour, and Live Stock to be imported in none but British built Ships, actually belonging to British Subjects, and navigated according to Law, clearing out from the Ports of His Majesty's European Dominions, and furnished with a Licence according to the Form hereunto annexed. (Repealed by Statute Law Revision Act 1871 (34 & 35 Vict. c. 116))
| Malt Duties Act 1785 (repealed) | 25 Geo. 3. c. 2 | 8 March 1785 |
An Act for continuing and granting to His Majesty certain Duties upon Malt, Mum, Cyder, and Perry, for the Service of the Year One thousand seven hundred and eighty-five. (Repealed by Statute Law Revision Act 1871 (34 & 35 Vict. c. 116))
| Marine Mutiny Act 1785 (repealed) | 25 Geo. 3. c. 3 | 8 March 1785 |
An Act for the Regulation of His Majesty's Marine Forces while on Shore. (Repealed by Statute Law Revision Act 1871 (34 & 35 Vict. c. 116))
| Land Tax Act 1785 (repealed) | 25 Geo. 3. c. 4 | 24 March 1785 |
An Act for granting an Aid to His Majesty by a Land Tax to be raised in Great Britain for the Service of the year One thousand Seven hundred and eighty-five. (Repealed by Statute Law Revision Act 1871 (34 & 35 Vict. c. 116))
| Trade with America Act 1785 (repealed) | 25 Geo. 3. c. 5 | 6 April 1785 |
An Act for further continuing, for a limited Time, an Act made in the Twenty-third Year of the Reign of His present Majesty, intituled, "An Act for preventing certain Instruments from being required from Ships belonging to the United States of America, and to give to His Majesty, for a limited Time, certain Powers for the better carrying on Trade and Commerce between the Subjects of His Majesty's Dominions and the Inhabitants of the said United States;" (Note: Trade with America (No. 2) Act 1783 (23 Geo. 3. c. 39)) and for continuing, for a limited Time, an Act made in the Twenty-fourth Year of the Reign of His present Majesty, intituled, "An Act to extend the Powers of an Act made in the Twenty-third Year of His present Majesty, (Note: Trade with America (No. 2) Act 1783 (23 Geo. 3. c. 39)) for giving His Majesty certain Powers for the better carrying on Trade and Commerce between the Subjects of His Majesty's Dominions and the Inhabitants of the United States of America, to the Trade and Commerce of this Kingdom with the British Colonies and Plantations in America with respect to certain Articles therein mentioned." (Note: Trade with British America Act 1784 (24 Geo. 3. Sess. 2. c. 45)) (Repealed by Statute Law Revision Act 1871 (34 & 35 Vict. c. 116))
| Mutiny Act 1785 (repealed) | 25 Geo. 3. c. 6 | 24 March 1785 |
An Act for punishing Mutiny and Desertion, and for the better Payment of the Army and their Quarters. (Repealed by Statute Law Revision Act 1871 (34 & 35 Vict. c. 116))
| Small Debts (Kent) Act 1785 (repealed) | 25 Geo. 3. c. 7 | 8 March 1785 |
An Act for the more easy and speedy Recovery of small Debts within the Town and Port of Faversham, the Hundreds of Faversham and Boughton, and the several Parishes of Ospringe, Seasalter, and Whitstable, in the County of Kent. (Repealed by County Courts Act 1846 (9 & 10 Vict. c. 95))
| Militia Pay Act 1785 (repealed) | 25 Geo. 3. c. 8 | 25 April 1785 |
An Act for defraying the Charge of the Militia in that Part of Great Britain called England, for One Year, beginning the Twenty-fifth Day of March One thousand seven hundred and eighty-five. (Repealed by Statute Law Revision Act 1871 (34 & 35 Vict. c. 116))
| Huntingdon (Improvement) Act 1785 (repealed) | 25 Geo. 3. c. 9 | 24 March 1785 |
An Act for paving, cleansing, and lighting the High Street and other Places within the Town of Huntingdon, and for removing and preventing Nuisances and Annoyances therein. (Repealed by Local Government Board's Provisional Orders Confirmation (Bristol, &c.) Act 1876 (39 & 40 Vict. c. xcvii))
| Gloucester Gaol Act 1785 (repealed) | 25 Geo. 3. c. 10 | 24 March 1785 |
An Act for building a New Gaol, a Penitentiary House, and certain New Houses of Correction for the County of Gloucester, and for regulating the same. (Repealed by Statute Law (Repeals) Act 2008 (c. 12))
| Loans or Exchequer Bills Act 1785 (repealed) | 25 Geo. 3. c. 11 | 25 April 1785 |
An Act for raising a certain Sum of Money by Loans or Exchequer Bills, for the Service of the Year One thousand seven hundred and eighty-five. (Repealed by Statute Law Revision Act 1871 (34 & 35 Vict. c. 116))
| Loans or Exchequer Bills (No. 2) Act 1785 (repealed) | 25 Geo. 3. c. 12 | 25 April 1785 |
An Act for raising a further Sum of Money by Loans or Exchequer Bills, for the Service of the Year One thousand seven hundred and eighty-five. (Repealed by Statute Law Revision Act 1871 (34 & 35 Vict. c. 116))
| Perth (Highways and Bridge) Act 1785 (repealed) | 25 Geo. 3. c. 13 | 6 April 1785 |
An Act for repairing the Highways, Bridges, and Ferries in the County of Perth. (Repealed by Statute Labour, Roads, Bridges and Ferries in Perthshire Act 1811 (51 Geo. 3. c. cxcvii))
| Lincoln (Drainage) Act 1785 (repealed) | 25 Geo. 3. c. 14 | 25 April 1785 |
An Act for draining and preserving certain Low Lands within the Parish of Timberland in the County of Lincoln. (Repealed by Timberland and Timberland Thorpe (Lincolnshire) Drainage Act 1839 (2 & 3 Vict. c. x))
| Liverpool Harbour Act 1785 (repealed) | 25 Geo. 3. c. 15 | 25 April 1785 |
An Act to enlarge the Term and Powers of several Acts relating to the Harbour of Liverpool; and for making Two additional Docks and Piers in or near the Port of Liverpool. (Repealed by Mersey Dock Acts Consolidation Act 1858 (21 & 22 Vict. c. xcii))
| Uxbridge (Streets) Act 1785 | 25 Geo. 3. c. 16 | 25 April 1785 |
An Act for taking down the present Market House and certain other Buildings in the Town of Uxbridge, for the Purpose of widening the High Street; and for paving the Footways, and lighting and cleansing the Streets and other Places within the said Town, and removing and preventing Nuisances and Annoyances therein; and for changing the Course of the Road between Mercer's Bridge and High Bridge; and for rebuilding the said Market House.
| Trial of a Certain Election Act 1785 (repealed) | 25 Geo. 3. c. 17 | 13 May 1785 |
An Act to enable the House of Commons to authorise the Select Committee appointed to try the Merits of the Petition of the Honourable Saint Andrew Saint John, complaining of an undue Election for the County of Bedford, to proceed in case the said Select Committee shall be reduced to a less Number than is prescribed by an Act made in the Tenth Year of the Reign of His present Majesty, intituled, "An Act to regulate the Trials of Controverted Elections or Returns of Members to serve in Parliament." (Note: Parliamentary Elections Act 1770 (10 Geo. 3. c. 16)) (Repealed by Statute Law Revision Act 1871 (34 & 35 Vict. c. 116))
| Newgate Gaol Delivery Act 1785 (repealed) | 25 Geo. 3. c. 18 | 13 May 1785 |
An Act to empower the Justices of Oyer and Terminer and Gaol Delivery of Newgate, for the County of Middlesex, to continue to hold a Session of Gaol Delivery of Newgate, begun to be holden before the Essoign Day of Term and Sitting of the King's Bench at Westminster, notwithstanding the happening of such Essoign Day or the Sitting of the said Court of King's Bench at Westminster, or elsewhere, in the said County of Middlesex. (Repealed by Statute Law Revision Act 1948 (11 & 12 Geo. 6. c. 62))
| Inquiry into Fees (Public Offices) Act 1785 (repealed) | 25 Geo. 3. c. 19 | 13 May 1785 |
An Act for appointing Commissioners to enquire into the Fees, Gratuities, Perquisites, and Emoluments which are or have been lately received in the several Public Offices therein mentioned; to examine into any Abuses which may exist in the same, and to report such Observations as shall occur to them for the better conducting and managing the Business transacted in the said Offices. (Repealed by Statute Law Revision Act 1871 (34 & 35 Vict. c. 116))
| Land Tax (Commissioners) Act 1785 (repealed) | 25 Geo. 3. c. 20 | 13 May 1785 |
An Act for appointing Commissioners to put in Execution an Act of this Session of Parliament, intituled, "An Act for granting an Aid to His Majesty by a Land-Tax to be raised in Great Britain, for the service of the Year One thousand seven hundred and eighty-five;" (Note: Land Tax Act 1785 (25 Geo. 3. c. 4)) together with those named in Three former Acts for appointing Commissioners of the Land Tax, and with those named in the Land-Tax Act of the Twenty-Third Year of His Majesty's Reign, and in the Land-Tax Act of this Session of Parliament. (Repealed by Statute Law Revision Act 1871 (34 & 35 Vict. c. 116))
| Exeter (Poor Relief) Act 1785 (repealed) | 25 Geo. 3. c. 21 | 13 May 1785 |
An Act to render more effectual several Acts of Parliament for erecting Hospitals and Workhouses within the City and County of the City of Exon, for the better employing and maintaining the Poor there, and to raise further Sums of Money for the better carrying the Purposes of the said Acts into Execution. (Repealed by Local Government Board's Provisional Order Confirmation (No. 11) Act 1913 (3 & 4 Geo. 5. c. cxxxv))
| Excise Act 1785 (repealed) | 25 Geo. 3. c. 22 | 13 May 1785 |
An Act for repealing so much of an Act made in the last Session of Parliament (Note: Duties on Spirits Act 1784 (24 Geo. 3. Sess. 2. c. 46)) as relates to the Distillation of Corn Spirits in certain Counties or Districts of the Highlands, in that Part of Great Britain called Scotland; and for authorising the Commissioners of Excise in Scotland to grant Licences to Persons living in the said Counties or Districts to distil Spirits from Barley, Bear or Big, the Growth of said Counties, and for imposing a Duty on such Licences. (Repealed by Statute Law Revision Act 1861 (24 & 25 Vict. c. 101) (Note: Incorrectly cited as "SLR 1871" in the Chronological Table of the Statutes.))
| Bermondsey, etc. (Streets) Act 1785 (repealed) | 25 Geo. 3. c. 23 | 25 April 1785 |
An Act for better paving, cleansing, lighting, and watching the Streets, Lanes, Yards, Courts, Alleys, and Passages within that Part of the Parish of Saint Mary Magdalen, Bermondsey, in the County of Surrey, called the Water Side Division; and for removing and preventing Nuisances and Annoyances therein; and for lighting and watching certain Parts of and belonging to the Turnpike Road leading from the East End of New Street in Southwark, to Deptford in the County of Kent, within the said Water Side Division of the said Parish therein mentioned. (Repealed by Bermondsey Improvement Act 1834 (4 & 5 Will. 4. c. xcv))
| Repeal of Certain Duties Act 1785 (repealed) | 25 Geo. 3. c. 24 | 13 May 1785 |
An Act to repeal so much of an Act made in the last Session of Parliament (Note: Duties on Linens Act 1784 (24 Geo. 3. Sess. 2. c. 40)) as imposes Duties on all Stuffs made of Cotton and Linen mixed, and Stuffs wholly made of Cotton Wool wove in Great Britain, not being printed, painted, or stained, and on Licences for bleaching or dyeing the same. (Repealed by Statute Law Revision Act 1871 (34 & 35 Vict. c. 116))
| Customs Act 1785 (repealed) | 25 Geo. 3. c. 25 | 13 May 1785 |
An Act for allowing further Time for the Importation of Goods, the Produce or Manufacture of the Island of Tobago, upon Payment of the British Plantation Duties. (Repealed by Statute Law Revision Act 1871 (34 & 35 Vict. c. 116))
| Sunderland Harbour Act 1785 (repealed) | 25 Geo. 3. c. 26 | 25 April 1785 |
An Act for the better Preservation and Improvement of the River Wear, and Port and Haven of Sunderland, in the County Palatine of Durham. (Repealed by River Wear and Sunderland Harbour Improvement Act 1809 (49 Geo. 3. c. xli), Sunderland Harbour and River Wear Navigation Act 1819 (59 Geo. 3. c. cvi) and River Wear and Sunderland Harbour Act 1830 (11 Geo. 4 & 1 Will. 4. c. xlix))
| Tunstead and Happing, Norfolk (Poor Relief) Act 1785 (repealed) | 25 Geo. 3. c. 27 | 13 May 1785 |
An Act for the better Relief and Employment of the Poor within the Hundreds of Tunstead and Happing in the County of Norfolk. (Repealed by Tunstead and Happing Hundreds (Norfolk) Poor Relief Act 1824 (5 Geo. 4. c. i) and Poor Law Board's Provisional Orders Confirmation Act 1869 (32 & 33 Vict. c. cxxiii))
| Edinburgh (Streets) Act 1785 or the South Bridge Act 1785 (repealed) | 25 Geo. 3. c. 28 | 13 May 1785 |
An Act for opening an easy and commodious Communication from the High Street of Edinburgh to the County Southward, and also from the Lawn Market to the new extended Royalty on the North; and for enabling Trustees to purchase Lands, Houses, and Areas for that Purpose; for widening and enlarging the Streets of the said City and certain Avenues leading to the same; for rebuilding or improving the University; for enlarging the public Markets and Communications thereto; for regulating certain Taxes; for lighting the said City; for providing an additional Supply of Water; for extending the Royalty of the said City; and for levying an additional Sum of Money for Statute Labour in the Middle District of the County of Edinburgh. (Repealed by Edinburgh Highways and Bridges Act 1835 (5 & 6 Will. 4. c. lxviii), Edinburgh Charity Workhouse Act 1844 (7 & 8 Vict. c. vi) and Edinburgh Police Act 1848 (11 & 12 Vict. c. cxiii))
| Bounties for Destroying Spanish Ships Act 1785 (repealed) | 25 Geo. 3. c. 29 | 13 June 1785 |
An Act to explain, amend, and render more effectual, an Act passed in the Twenty-third Year of His present Majesty's Reign, intituled, "An Act for authorizing the Treasurer of the Navy, to pay to the Garrison and Naval Department at Gibraltar, the like Bounty for destroying certain Spanish Ships of War, as is allowed to the Officers and Men on board any of His Majesty's Ships of War, taking or destroying Ships of War belonging to the Enemy." (Note: Bounty to Garrison of Gibraltar Act 1783 (23 Geo. 3. c. 16)) (Repealed by Statute Law Revision Act 1871 (34 & 35 Vict. c. 116))
| Duties on Shops Act 1785 (repealed) | 25 Geo. 3. c. 30 | 13 June 1785 |
An Act for granting to His Majesty certain Duties on Shops within Great Britain. (Repealed by Duties on Shops Act 1789 (29 Geo. 3. c. 9))
| Treasurer of the Navy Act 1785 (repealed) | 25 Geo. 3. c. 31 | 13 June 1785 |
An Act for better regulating the Office of the Treasurer of His Majesty's Navy. (Repealed by Treasurer of the Navy Act 1830 (11 Geo. 4 & 1 Will. 4. c. 42))
| National Debt Act 1785 (repealed) | 25 Geo. 3. c. 32 | 13 June 1785 |
An Act for granting Annuities to satisfy certain Navy, Victualling, and Transport Bills, and Ordnance Debentures. (Repealed by Statute Law Revision Act 1870 (33 & 34 Vict. c. 69))
| Loans or Exchequer Bills (No. 3) Act 1785 (repealed) | 25 Geo. 3. c. 33 | 13 June 1785 |
An Act for raising a further Sum of Money by Exchequer Bills, for the Service of the Year One thousand seven hundred and eighty-five. (Repealed by Statute Law Revision Act 1871 (34 & 35 Vict. c. 116))
| Ramsgate (Streets) Act 1785 (repealed) | 25 Geo. 3. c. 34 | 13 May 1785 |
An Act for better paving, cleansing, repairing, lighting, and watching the Highways, Streets, and Lanes of and in the Vill of Ramsgate, in the County of Kent; and for removing and preventing Annoyances therein; and for erecting a Market House, and holding a Public Market in the said Vill. (Repealed by Ramsgate Improvement Act 1838 (1 & 2 Vict. c. lxx))
| Crown Debtors Act 1785 (repealed) | 25 Geo. 3. c. 35 | 13 June 1785 |
An Act for the more easy and effectual Sale of Lands, Tenements, and Hereditaments, of Crown Debtors or of their Sureties. (Repealed by Crown Proceedings Act 1947 (10 & 11 Geo. 6. c. 44))
| Great Yarmouth (Improvement) Act 1785 (repealed) | 25 Geo. 3. c. 36 | 13 May 1785 |
An Act for building a new Bridge over the Haven of Great Yarmouth; and for enlarging the Term and altering some of the Powers of an Act of the Twelfth Year of His present Majesty (Note: Great Yarmouth (Improvement) Act 1772 (12 Geo. 3 c. 14)) for clearing depthening, repairing, maintaining, and improving the Haven and Piers of Great Yarmouth; and for depthening and making more navigable the several Rivers emptying themselves into the said Haven; and for preserving Ships, wintering therein, from Accidents by Fire. (Repealed by Great Yarmouth Haven, Bridge and Navigation Act 1835 (5 & 6 Will. 4. c. xlix))
| Ayr Bridge Act 1785 (repealed) | 25 Geo. 3. c. 37 | 13 June 1785 |
An Act for rebuilding the Bridge across the River of Ayr, at the Town of Ayr. (Repealed by Ayr Bridge Act 1844 (7 & 8 Vict. c. ci))
| Bancroft's Patent Act 1785 (repealed) | 25 Geo. 3. c. 38 | 13 June 1785 |
An Act for vesting in Edward Bancroft Doctor in Physic, his Executors, Administrators, and Assigns, the sole Property of his Invention or Discovery of the Use and Application of certain Vegetables, for dyeing, staining, printing, and painting, certain valuable Colours, throughout that Part of His Majesty's Kingdom of Great Britain called England, the Dominion of Wales, and Town of Berwick-upon-Tweed, for a limited Time. (Repealed by Statute Law Revision Act 1948 (11 & 12 Geo. 6. c. 62))
| Cromarty Harbour Act 1785 | 25 Geo. 3. c. 39 | 13 June 1785 |
An Act for the better preserving and maintaining the Piers and Harbour of Cromarty in North Britain.
| Woollen, etc., Manufactures, Bedfordshire Act 1785 (repealed) | 25 Geo. 3. c. 40 | 13 June 1785 |
An Act for more effectually preventing Frauds and Abuses, committed by Persons employed in the Manufactures of combing Wool, Worsted Yarn, and Goods made from Worsted, in the Counties of Bedford, Huntingdon, Northampton, Leicester, Rutland, and Lincoln, and the Isle of Ely. (Repealed by Master and Servant Act 1889 (52 & 53 Vict. c. 24))
| Richmond (Poor Relief, etc.) Act 1785 | 25 Geo. 3. c. 41 | 13 June 1785 |
An Act to repeal Part of an Act passed in the Sixth Year of His present Majesty, (Note: Richmond, Surrey, Poor Relief, Improvement and Roads Act 1766 (6 Geo. 3. c. 72)) for the Relief and Employment of the Poor of the Parish of Richmond, in the County of Surrey, and other Purposes in the said Act mentioned, and for making new Provisions for the Relief and Employment of the Poor, for the Repairs of the Highways, the paving, cleansing, lighting, and watching, the Streets and other Places in the Town and Parish of Richmond aforesaid, for the Removal and Prevention of Annoyances, Obstructions, and Encroachments therein, for enclosing certain Commons or Waste Land, within the said Parish, for the Use of the Poor; and to enable the Vestrymen of the said Parish to erect a Workhouse thereon, and to purchase Land for a Burial Ground, and also to enable His Majesty to shut up a Lane within the said Parish called Love Lane.
| Lord Dundonald's Patent (Tar, Pitch, etc.) Act 1785 (repealed) | 25 Geo. 3. c. 42 | 13 June 1785 |
An Act for vesting in Archibald Earl of Dundonald, his Executors, Administrators, and Assigns, the sole Use and Property of a Method of extracting or making Tar, Pitch, Essential Oils, Volatile Alkali, Mineral Acids, Salts, and Cinders, from Pit Coal throughout His Majesty's Dominions, for a limited Time. (Repealed by Statute Law Revision Act 1948 (11 & 12 Geo. 6. c. 62))
| Duties on Servants Act 1785 (repealed) | 25 Geo. 3. c. 43 | 4 July 1785 |
An Act to repeal the Duties on Male Servants, and for granting new Duties on Male and Female Servants. (Repealed by Duties on Servants Act 1792 (32 Geo. 3. c. 3) and House Tax Act 1803 (43 Geo. 3. c. 161))
| Insurances on Ships, etc. Act 1785 (repealed) | 25 Geo. 3. c. 44 | 4 July 1785 |
An Act for regulating Insurances on Ships, and on Goods, Merchandizes or Effects. (Repealed by Marine Insurance Act 1788 (28 Geo. 3. c. 56))
| Debtors (Middlesex) Act 1785 (repealed) | 25 Geo. 3. c. 45 | 4 July 1785 |
An Act for reducing the Time for the Imprisonment of Debtors committed to Prison upon Prosecutions in Courts of Conscience in London, Middlesex and the Borough of Southwark, to the same Periods, in each Court, and for abolishing Fees paid by those Debtors to Gaolers or others on account of such Imprisonment. (Repealed by City of London Court of Requests Act 1835 (5 & 6 Will. 4. c. xciv))
| Transportation, etc. Act 1785 (repealed) | 25 Geo. 3. c. 46 | 4 July 1785 |
An Act for the more effectual Transportation of Felons and other Offenders in that Part of Great Britain called Scotland, and to authorize the Removal of Prisoners in certain Cases. (Repealed by Statute Law Revision Act 1861 (24 & 25 Vict. c. 101))
| Excise (No. 2) Act 1785 (repealed) | 25 Geo. 3. c. 47 | 4 July 1785 |
An Act for transferring the Receipt and Management of certain Duties therein mentioned, from the Commissioners of Excise, and the Commissioners of Stamps, respectively, to the Commissioners for the Affairs of Taxes, and also for making further Provisions in respect to the said Duties so transferred. (Repealed by Duties on Wagons, etc. Act 1792 (32 Geo. 3. c. 4) and House Tax Act 1803 (43 Geo. 3. c. 161))
| Pawnbrokers Act 1785 or the Pawnbroker's Licence Act 1785 (repealed) | 25 Geo. 3. c. 48 | 4 July 1785 |
An Act for granting to His Majesty certain Stamp Duties on Licences to be taken out by Persons using or exercising, the Trade or Business of a Pawnbroker. (Repealed by Pawnbrokers Act 1872 (35 & 36 Vict. c. 93))
| Duties on Coachmakers' Licences, etc. Act 1785 (repealed) | 25 Geo. 3. c. 49 | 4 July 1785 |
An Act for granting to His Majesty certain Duties upon Licences to be taken out by Coachmakers, and also certain Duties upon Carriages to be Built for Sale. (Repealed by Statute Law Revision Act 1861 (24 & 25 Vict. c. 101))
| Game Certificates Act 1785 (repealed) | 25 Geo. 3. c. 50 | 4 July 1785 |
An Act for repealing an Act made in the Twenty-fourth Year of the Reign of His present Majesty, intituled, "An Act for granting to His Majesty certain Duties on Certificates issued with respect to the Killing of Game," (Note: Game Certificates Act 1784 (24 Geo. 3. Sess. 2. c. 43)) and for granting other Duties in Lieu thereof. (Repealed by Statute Law Revision Act 1861 (24 & 25 Vict. c. 101))
| Duties on Post Horses, etc. Act 1785 (repealed) | 25 Geo. 3. c. 51 | 4 July 1785 |
An Act for repealing the Duties on Licences taken out by Persons letting Horses for the Purpose of travelling Post, and on Horses let to Hire for travelling Post, and by Time, and on Stage Coaches, and for granting other Duties in Lieu thereof, and also additional Duties on Horses let to Hire for travelling Post, and by Time. (Repealed by Stage Carriages Act 1832 (2 & 3 Will. 4. c. 120))
| Audit of Public Accounts Act 1785 (repealed) | 25 Geo. 3. c. 52 | 4 July 1785 |
An Act for better examining and auditing the Public Accounts of this Kingdom. (Repealed by Exchequer and Audit Departments Act 1866 (29 & 30 Vict. c. 39))
| Annuity to Duke of Gloucester Act 1785 (repealed) | 25 Geo. 3. c. 53 | 4 July 1785 |
An Act for settling an Annuity of Nine Thousand Pounds, on His Royal Highness the Duke of Gloucester, in Lieu of the like Annuity payable out of the Duties of Four and One Half per Centum, in Barbadoes and the Leeward Islands. (Repealed by Statute Law Revision Act 1871 (34 & 35 Vict. c. 116))
| Duties on Coals, etc. Act 1785 (repealed) | 25 Geo. 3. c. 54 | 4 July 1785 |
An Act for better securing the Duties upon Coals, Culm, and Cinders. (Repealed by Customs Law Repeal Act 1825 (6 Geo. 4. c. 105))
| Glove Duties Act 1785 (repealed) | 25 Geo. 3. c. 55 | 4 July 1785 |
An Act for granting to His Majesty certain Duties on Licences to be taken out by Persons vending Gloves or Mittens, and also certain Duties on Gloves and Mittens sold by Retail. (Repealed by Stamps Act 1794 (34 Geo. 3. c. 10), Stamps Act 1796 (36 Geo. 3. c. 80) and Customs Law Repeal Act 1825 (6 Geo. 4. c. 105))
| Cordage for Shipping Act 1785 (repealed) | 25 Geo. 3. c. 56 | 4 July 1785 |
An Act for more effectually preventing Deceits and Frauds in the Manufacturing of Cordage for Shipping, and to prevent the illicit Importation of foreign made Cordage. (Repealed by Statute Law Revision Act 1871 (34 & 35 Vict. c. 116))
| Turnpike Toll Act 1785 (repealed) | 25 Geo. 3. c. 57 | 20 July 1785 |
An Act to exempt Carriages carrying the Mail from paying Tolls at any Turnpike Gate in Great Britain. (Repealed by Post Office (Repeal of Laws) Act 1837 (7 Will. 4 & 1 Vict. c. 32))
| Pilchard Fishery Act 1785 (repealed) | 25 Geo. 3. c. 58 | 20 July 1785 |
An Act for the Encouragement of the Pilchard Fishery, by allowing a farther Bounty upon Pilchards taken, cured, and exported. (Repealed by Statute Law Revision Act 1861 (24 & 25 Vict. c. 101))
| Lottery Act 1785 (repealed) | 25 Geo. 3. c. 59 | 20 July 1785 |
An Act for granting to His Majesty a certain Sum of Money to be raised by a Lottery. (Repealed by Statute Law Revision Act 1871 (34 & 35 Vict. c. 116))
| Appropriation, etc. Act 1785 (repealed) | 25 Geo. 3. c. 60 | 20 July 1785 |
An Act for granting to His Majesty a certain Sum of Money out of the Sinking Fund, and for applying certain Monies therein mentioned for the Service of the Year One thousand seven hundred and eighty-five, and for further appropriating the Supplies granted in this Session of Parliament, and for providing a Compensation to the Clerks in the Offices of the Principal Secretaries of State for the Advantages such Clerks enjoyed before the Commencement of an Act made in the Twenty-fourth Year of the Reign of His present Majesty, (Note: Postage Act 1784 (24 Geo. 3. Sess. 2. c. 8)) for establishing certain Regulations concerning the Portage and Conveyance of Letters and Packets by the Post between Great Britain and Ireland. (Repealed by Statute Law Revision Act 1871 (34 & 35 Vict. c. 116))
| Civil List Act 1785 (repealed) | 25 Geo. 3. c. 61 | 20 July 1785 |
An Act to authorize the Lord Steward of the Household, the Lord Chamberlain, the Master of the Horse, the Master of the Robes, and the Lords of the Treasury, respectively, to pay Bounties granted by His Majesty to Persons in low and indigent Circumstances. (Repealed by Statute Law Revision Act 1871 (34 & 35 Vict. c. 116))
| Exportation Act 1785 (repealed) | 25 Geo. 3. c. 62 | 25 July 1785 |
An Act to prohibit for a limited Time the Exportation of Hay. (Repealed by Statute Law Revision Act 1871 (34 & 35 Vict. c. 116))
| Salt Duties Act 1785 (repealed) | 25 Geo. 3. c. 63 | 20 July 1785 |
An Act for reducing the Allowances for Waste on Salt and Rock Salt; for regulating the Exportation of Salt to Jersey, Guernsey, Alderney, and Sark; for repealing the Laws allowing the Use of Foul Salt for Manure only; for allowing a Drawback on the Exportation of Glauber or Epsom Salts; for restraining Fish-Curers from being Dealers in Salt; for regulating the Exportation of Herrings from the Isle of Man; for better securing the Duties on Salt; and for indemnifying Persons who have been guilty of Offences against the Laws relating to the Duties on Salt. (Repealed by Statute Law Revision Act 1861 (24 & 25 Vict. c. 101))
| Plate (Duties, Drawbacks) Act 1785 (repealed) | 25 Geo. 3. c. 64 | 20 July 1785 |
An Act for altering and amending an Act made in the last Session of Parliament, intituled, "An Act for granting to His Majesty certain Duties on all Gold and Silver Plate imported; and also certain Duties on all Gold and Silver wrought Plate made in Great Britain." (Note: Plate Duties Act 1784 (24 Geo. 3. Sess. 2. c. 53)) (Repealed by Customs and Inland Revenue Act 1890 (53 & 54 Vict. c. 8))
| Fisheries Act 1785 (repealed) | 25 Geo. 3. c. 65 | 20 July 1785 |
An Act for the further Encouragement of the British Fisheries. (Repealed by Statute Law Revision Act 1861 (24 & 25 Vict. c. 101))
| Duties on Bricks and Tiles Act 1785 (repealed) | 25 Geo. 3. c. 66 | 20 July 1785 |
An Act to explain and amend an Act made in the Twenty-fourth Year of the Reign of His present Majesty, intituled, "An Act for granting to His Majesty certain Rates and Duties upon Bricks and Tiles made in Great Britain, and for laying additional Duties on Bricks and Tiles imported into the same." (Note: Duties on Bricks and Tiles Act 1784 (24 Geo. 3. Sess. 2. c. 24)) (Repealed by Duties on Bricks Act 1839 (2 & 3 Vict. c. 24))
| Exportation Act (No. 2) 1785 (repealed) | 25 Geo. 3. c. 67 | 20 July 1785 |
An Act to prohibit the Exportation to foreign Parts, of Tools and Utensils made Use of in the Iron and Steel Manufactures of this Kingdom; and to prevent the seducing of Artificers or Workmen employed in those Manufactures to go into Parts beyond the Seas. (Repealed by Customs Law Repeal Act 1825 (6 Geo. 4. c. 105))
| Audit of Public Accounts Act 1785 (repealed) | 25 Geo. 3. c. 68 | 25 July 1785 |
An Act for appointing and enabling Commissioners further to examine, take, and state, the Public Accounts of the Kingdom. (Repealed by Statute Law Revision Act 1871 (34 & 35 Vict. c. 116))
| Customs (No. 2) Act 1785 (repealed) | 25 Geo. 3. c. 69 | 20 July 1785 |
An Act to repeal the Duties upon Flasks in which Florence Wine and Oil is imported; to permit the Importation of Wines in shall Casks for private Use; to revive, continue and amend so much of an Act made in the Sixteenth Year of His present Majesty (Note: Exportation Act 1776 (16 Geo. 3. c. 37)) as allows the Exportation of certain Quantities of Wheat and other Articles to His Majesty's Sugar Colonies in America; for disallowing the Drawback on the Exportation of Snuff; for continuing the Permission to land Rum or Spirits of the British Sugar Plantations before Payment of the Duties of Excise; for reviving and continuing the Premiums upon the Importation of Pitch, Tar, and Turpentine from East Florida into Great Britain; for allowing a Bounty upon the Exportation of Silk Gauzes and a Drawback upon the Exportation of Raw Silk. (Repealed by Statute Law Revision Act 1861 (24 & 25 Vict. c. 101))
| Duties on Servants (No. 2) Act 1785 (repealed) | 25 Geo. 3. c. 70 | 2 August 1785 |
An Act to rectify a Mistake in an Act passed in this present Session of Parliament, intituled, "An Act to repeal the Duties on Male Servants, and for granting new Duties on Male and Female Servants." (Note: Duties on Servants Act 1785 (25 Geo. 3. c. 43)) (Repealed by Statute Law Revision Act 1872 (35 & 36 Vict. c. 63))
| National Debt (No. 2) Act 1785 (repealed) | 25 Geo. 3. c. 71 | 2 August 1785 |
An Act for extending the Time limited by an Act of this Session (Note: National Debt Act 1785 (25 Geo. 3. c. 32)) for delivering in Navy, Victualling, and Transport Bills. (Repealed by Statute Law Revision Act 1870 (33 & 34 Vict. c. 69))
| Duties on Linens Act 1785 (repealed) | 25 Geo. 3. c. 72 | 20 July 1785 |
An Act for repealing the Duties on Linens to be printed, painted, stained, or dyed in Great Britain, imposed by an Act made in the last Session of Parliament, (Note: Duties on Linens Act 1784 (24 Geo. 3. Sess. 2. c. 40)) and for granting other Duties in Lieu thereof; and on Cotton Stuffs, Muslins, Fustians, Velvets, and Velverets wove in Great Britain, to be printed, stained, painted, or dyed; and upon the Importation of Linens, Cotton Stuffs, Muslins, Fustians, Velvets and Velverets, printed, stained, painted, or dyed, in Foreign Parts. (Repealed by Statute Law Revision Act 1861 (24 & 25 Vict. c. 101))
| Allowance to Brewers Act 1785 (repealed) | 25 Geo. 3. c. 73 | 2 August 1785 |
An Act to declare that Brewers selling Beer or Ale in less Quantities than a Cask containing Four Gallons and a Half, shall not be entitled to any Allowance out of the Duties of Excise for Waste or Leakage; and for making Allowances to Distillers of low Wines and Spirits from Malt, Corn, or Grain in Respect to the Duties imposed by an Act of the last Session of Parliament. (Repealed by Statute Law Revision Act 1861 (24 & 25 Vict. c. 101))
| Excise (No. 3) Act 1785 (repealed) | 25 Geo. 3. c. 74 | 2 August 1785 |
An Act for repealing the Duty imposed on Tea by an Act passed in the last Session of Parliament, (Note: Commutation Act 1784 (24 Geo. 3. Sess. 2. c. 38)) and for granting other Duties in Lieu thereof; for repealing so much of several Acts as relates to the Removal of Tea; for directing the Officers of Excise to examine and certify the Exportation of Exciseable Commodities; and for better securing the Duties on Candles. (Repealed by Statute Law Revision Act 1871 (34 & 35 Vict. c. 116))
| Stamp Duties Act 1785 (repealed) | 25 Geo. 3. c. 75 | 2 August 1785 |
An Act to extend the Provisions of an Act made in the Twenty-third Year of His present Majesty's Reign, (Note: Stamp Duties Act 1783 (23 Geo. 3. c. 67)) for granting to His Majesty a Stamp Duty on the Registry of Burials, Marriages, Births and Christenings, to the Registry of Burials, Births and Christenings of Protestant Dissenters from the Church of England. (Repealed by Stamps (No. 2) Act 1794 (34 Geo. 3. c. 11))
| American Loyalists Act 1785 (repealed) | 25 Geo. 3. c. 76 | 2 August 1785 |
An Act for appointing Commissioners further to enquire into the Losses and Services of all such Persons who have suffered in their Rights, Properties and Possessions, during the late unhappy Dissentions in America, in consequence of their Loyalty to His Majesty, and Attachment to the British Government. (Repealed by Statute Law Revision Act 1871 (34 & 35 Vict. c. 116))
| Fires Prevention Act 1785 or the Fires Prevention (Metropolis) Act 1785 (repealed) | 25 Geo. 3. c. 77 | 20 July 1785 |
An Act to amend so much of an Act passed in the Fourteenth Year of the Reign of His present Majesty, (Note: Fires Prevention (Metropolis) Act 1774 (14 Geo. 3. c. 78)) for the further and better regulation of Buildings and Party Walls, and for the more effectually preventing Mischiefs by Fire within the Cities of London and Westminster, and the Liberties thereof, and other the Places therein mentioned, as relates to Manufactories of Turpentine; for extending the Provisions of the said Act, so amended, to Manufactories of Pitch, Tar, and Turpentine, throughout that Part of Great Britain called England; and for indemnifying the Proprietor of a Turpentine Manufactory in Potter's Fields in the Borough of Southwark, against the Penalties he may be liable to under the said Act; and for excepting, for a limited Time, his said Manufactory from the Provisions herein contained. (Repealed by Limitations of Actions and Costs Act 1842 (5 & 6 Vict. c. 97), Statute Law Revision Act 1871 (34 & 35 Vict. c. 116), Statute Law Revision Act 1887 (50 & 51 Vict. c. 59), Statute Law Revision Act 1888 (51 & 52 Vict. c. 3), Statute Law Revision Act 1948 (11 & 12 Geo. 6. c. 62) and Criminal Law Act 1967 (c. 58))
| Hawkers Act 1785 (repealed) | 25 Geo. 3. c. 78 | 2 August 1785 |
An Act for granting to His Majesty additional Duties on Hawkers, Pedlars, and Petty Chapmen, and for regulating their Trade. (Repealed by Statute Law Revision Act 1871 (34 & 35 Vict. c. 116))
| Medicine Duties Act 1785 (repealed) | 25 Geo. 3. c. 79 | 2 August 1785 |
An Act for repealing an Act made in the Twenty-third Year of the Reign of His present Majesty, intituled, "An Act for granting to His Majesty a Stamp Duty on Licences to be taken out by certain Persons uttering or vending Medicines, and certain Stamp Duties on all Medicines sold under such Licences, or under the Authority of His Majesty's Letters Patent," (Note: Stamp Duties (No. 3) Act 1783 (23 Geo. 3. c. 62)) and for granting other Duties in Lieu thereof. (Repealed by Statute Law Revision Act 1871 (34 & 35 Vict. c. 116))
| Stamps Act 1785 (repealed) | 25 Geo. 3. c. 80 | 2 August 1785 |
An Act for granting to His Majesty certain Duties on Certificates to be taken out by Solicitors, Attornies, and others practising in certain Courts of Justice in Great Britain, and certain other Duties with Respect to Warrants, Mandates, and Authorities to be entered or filed of Record as therein mentioned. (Repealed by Inland Revenue Repeal Act 1870 (33 & 34 Vict. c. 99))
| Duties on Tobacco Act 1785 (repealed) | 25 Geo. 3. c. 81 | 2 August 1785 |
An Act for the better securing the Duties payable on Tobacco. (Repealed by Statute Law Revision Act 1871 (34 & 35 Vict. c. 116))
| Indemnity Act 1785 (repealed) | 25 Geo. 3. c. 82 | 4 July 1785 |
An Act to indemnify such Persons as have omitted to qualify themselves for Offices and Employments, and to indemnify Justices of the Peace or others, who have omitted to register or deliver in their Qualifications within the Time limited by Law, and for giving further Time for those Purposes, and to indemnify Members and Officers in Cities, Corporations, and Borough Towns, whose Admissions have been omitted to be stamped according to Law, or having been stamped, have been lost or mislaid; and for allowing them Time to provide Admissions duly stamped, to give further Time to such Persons as have omitted to make and file Affidavits of the Executions of Indentures of Clerks to Attornies and Solicitors, and for indemnifying Persons who have acted as Trustees of Turnpike Roads in certain Cases, and declaring their Proceedings valid. (Repealed by Promissory Oaths Act 1871 (34 & 35 Vict. c. 48))
| Bank of England Act 1785 (repealed) | 25 Geo. 3. c. 83 | 20 July 1785 |
An Act for further postponing the Payment of the Sum of Two Millions advanced by the Governor and Company of the Bank of England, towards the Supply for the Service of the Year One thousand seven hundred and eighty-one. (Repealed by Statute Law Revision Act 1870 (33 & 34 Vict. c. 69))
| Parliamentary Elections Act 1785 (repealed) | 25 Geo. 3. c. 84 | 2 August 1785 |
An Act to limit the Duration of Polls and Scrutinies, and for making other Regulations touching the Election of Members to serve in Parliament for Places within England and Wales, and for Berwick upon Tweed, and also for removing Difficulties which may arise for Want of Returns being made of Members to serve in Parliament. (Repealed by Ballot Act 1872 (35 & 36 Vict. c. 33), Statute Law Revision Act 1872 (35 & 36 Vict. c. 63) and Representation of the People Act 1918 (7 & 8 Geo. 5. c. 64))
| Reading (Streets) Act 1785 (repealed) | 25 Geo. 3. c. 85 | 13 June 1785 |
An Act for paving the Footways in the Borough of Reading, in the County of Berks, for better repairing, cleansing, lighting, and watching, the Streets, Lanes, Passages, and Places, in the said Borough, and for removing Encroachments, Obstructions, and Annoyances therefrom, and preventing the like for the future. (Repealed by Reading Improvement Act 1826 (7 Geo. 4. c. lvi))
| Saint Catherine, Tower of London (Watching, etc.) Act 1785 (repealed) | 25 Geo. 3. c. 86 | 13 June 1785 |
An Act for better watching, lighting, and cleansing, such Parts of the Precinct of Saint Catherine near the Tower of London, in the County of Middlesex, as are not included in the Provisions of certain Acts, passed in the Seventh (Note: Saint Botolph, Aldgate (Improvement) Act 1766 (7 Geo. 3. c. 85)) and Ninth (Note: Saint Botolph, Aldgate (Improvement) Act 1769 (9 Geo. 3. c. 22)) Years of His present Majesty's Reign; and for preventing Nuisances and Annoyances therein. (Repealed by St. Katherine's Precinct Improvement Act 1814 (54 Geo. 3. c. ccxx))
| Dudley Canal Act 1785 (repealed) | 25 Geo. 3. c. 87 | 4 July 1785 |
An Act for extending the Dudley Canal to the Birmingham Canal, at or near Tipton Green in the County of Stafford. (Repealed by Birmingham Canal Navigations Act 1835 (5 & 6 Will. 4. c. xxxiv) and Birmingham and Dudley Canal Consolidation Act 1846 (9 & 10 Vict. c. cclxix))
| Clapham (Streets) Act 1785 (repealed) | 25 Geo. 3. c. 88 | 4 July 1785 |
An Act for lighting and watching the Village of Clapham, and certain Roads leading thereto, in the County of Surrey. (Repealed by London Government (Borough of Wandsworth) Order in Council 1901 (SR&O 1901/222))
| Lambeth Waterworks Act 1785 (repealed) | 25 Geo. 3. c. 89 | 4 July 1785 |
An Act for supplying the Inhabitants of the Parish of Lambeth, and Parts adjacent in the County of Surrey, with Water. (Repealed by Lambeth Waterworks Act 1848 (11 & 12 Vict. c. vii))
| Arundel (Improvement) Act 1785 (repealed) | 25 Geo. 3. c. 90 | 4 July 1785 |
An Act for the better paving, cleansing, and lighting the Streets, Lanes, Ways, and Passages within the Borough of Arundel in the County of Sussex, and for removing and preventing Incroachments, Obstructions and Annoyances therein. (Repealed by Local Government Board's Provisional Orders Confirmation (Arundel, &c.) Act 1876 (39 & 40 Vict. c. xiii))
| Bridport (Improvement) Act 1785 | 25 Geo. 3. c. 91 | 13 June 1785 |
An Act for taking down the Market House in the Borough of Bridport, in the County of Dorset, and rebuilding the same, together with a Session or Court House in a more convenient Situation, for removing the Shambles or Butcher Row, for better paving, cleansing, lighting, and watching the said Borough, for removing and preventing Nuisances and Annoyances, and for prohibiting the covering of any new Houses or Buildings within the said Borough with Thatch.
| Saint John in Beverley and Skidby, Yorkshire (Drainage) Act 1785 or the Beverley and Skidby Drainage Act 1785 | 25 Geo. 3. c. 92 | 13 June 1785 |
An Act for draining, preserving, and improving, certain Low Grounds and Carrs in the several Parishes of Saint John in Beverley, and of Skidby in the East Riding of the County of York.
| Salisbury (Improvement) Act 1785 | 25 Geo. 3. c. 93 | 4 July 1785 |
An Act for the Removal and rebuilding of the Council Chamber, Guildhall, and Gaol of the City of New Sarum, and for ascertaining the Tolls of the Market, and regulating the Chairmen within the said City.
| Kidderminster Church Act 1785 (repealed) | 25 Geo. 3. c. 94 | 13 June 1785 |
An Act for repairing, new pewing, seating, and erecting Galleries, and making other Alterations and Additions in and to the Parish Church of Kidderminster, in the County of Worcester. (Repealed by Statute Law (Repeals) Act 1998 (c. 43))
| Holy Trinity Church, Bristol Act 1785 | 25 Geo. 3. c. 95 | 4 July 1785 |
An Act for rebuilding the Parish Church of Christ Church, otherwise the Holy Trinity, within the City of Bristol, and for widening the Streets adjacent thereto.
| Shoreditch Streets Act 1785 (repealed) | 25 Geo. 3. c. 96 | 4 July 1785 |
An Act for amending Two Acts of the Eighth (Note: Shoreditch Streets Act 1768 (8 Geo. 3. c. 33)) and Sixteenth (Note: Shoreditch Streets Act 1776 (16 Geo. 3. c. 60)) Years of His Present Majesty for opening certain Passages, and for paving the Streets and other Places in the Parish of Saint Leonard, Shoreditch, and such Part of Hog Lane as lies within the Liberty of Norton Falgate in the County of Middlesex, and for preventing Annoyances therein. (Repealed by Statute Law (Repeals) Act 2013 (c. 2))
| City of London (Improvement) Act 1785 (repealed) | 25 Geo. 3. c. 97 | 25 July 1785 |
An Act to enable the Mayor and Commonalty, and Citizens of the City of London, to pull down the Poultry and Wood Street Compters, and to purchase certain Ground and Buildings within the said City, for the Purpose of re-building the same. (Repealed by Statute Law (Repeals) Act 2008 (c. 12))
| Crown Lands at North Scotland Yard, Middlesex Act 1785 (repealed) | 25 Geo. 3. c. 98 | 4 July 1785 |
An Act to enable His Majesty to grant the Inheritance of certain Lands, Tenements, and Hereditaments, situate in or near North Scotland Yard, in the County of Middlesex, in Exchange for the Inheritance of certain Buildings or Barracks, and Land adjoining thereto, and also of certain Ground contiguous to Tinmouth Castle, in the County of Northumberland, belonging to the Duke of Northumberland, or for such further or other Compensation as shall be a full Consideration for the same, and also to empower the said Duke to make such Exchange. (Repealed by Statute Law (Repeals) Act 1978 (c. 45))
| Birmingham Canal Navigation Act 1785 | 25 Geo. 3. c. 99 | 13 June 1785 |
An Act to enable the Company of Proprietors of the Navigation from the Trent to the Mersey, and the Company of Proprietors of the Navigation from Birmingham to Fazeley, to make a Navigable Canal from the said Trent and Mersey Navigation on Fradley Heath, in the County of Stafford, to Fazeley in the said County; and for confirming certain Articles of Agreement entered into between the said Trent and Mersey, the Oxford and the Coventry Canal Navigation Companies. (Repealed by Oxford Canal Navigation Act 1829 (10 Geo. 4. c. xlviii) and Birmingham Canal Navigations Act 1835 (5 & 6 Will. 4. c. xxxiv))
| Arun, Sussex Navigation Act 1785 | 25 Geo. 3. c. 100 | 13 May 1785 |
An Act for amending and improving the Navigation of the River Arun from Houghton Bridge in the Parish of Houghton, in the County of Sussex, to Pallenham Wharf in the Parish of Wisborough Green, in the said County; and for continuing and extending the Navigation of the said River Arun from the said Wharf called Pallenham Wharf to a certain Bridge called New Bridge, situate in the Parishes of Pullborough and Wisborough Green, in the said County of Sussex.
| Salop Roads Act 1785 (repealed) | 25 Geo. 3. c. 101 | 8 March 1785 |
An Act for continuing the Term and Powers of an Act made in the Fourth Year of His present Majesty's Reign, (Note: Salop Roads (No. 2) Act 1764 (4 Geo. 3. c. 81)) for repairing several Roads leading from the Buck's Head at Watling Street to Beckbury and the New-Inn, and from the Birches Brook to the Hand Post in the Parish of Kemberton, in the County of Salop, and for making the same more effectual. (Repealed by Roads from Watling Street, Birches Brook and Ball's Hill (Salop.) Act 1827 (7 & 8 Geo. 4. c. xv))
| Roads from Whitchurch and Hinstock Act 1785 (repealed) | 25 Geo. 3. c. 102 | 8 March 1785 |
An Act to continue the Term and alter and enlarge the Powers of an Act made in the Seventh Year of His Present Majesty's Reign, (Note: Roads from Whitchurch and Hinstock Act 1766 (7 Geo. 3. c. 92)) to repair and widen the Roads from Whitchurch, in the County of Salop, to the Turnpike Road (Note: The junction of the A525 Keele Road/A531 Crewe Road in Madeley Heath, Staffordshire (the former Newcastle-under-Lyme to Nantwich turnpike road) with the A525 Newcastle Road to Whitchurch. 53°00′26″N 2°19′23″W) between Nantwich, in the County of Chester, and Newcastle-under-Lyne, and from Hinstock (Note: Hinstock, Shropshire.) to Nantwich aforesaid. (Repealed by Roads from Whitchurch (Salop.) and from Hinstock Act 1824 (5 Geo. 4. c. xxxii))
| Biddenden and Boundgate Road Act 1785 (repealed) | 25 Geo. 3. c. 103 | 8 March 1785 |
An Act for continuing an Act of the Sixth Year of His present Majesty, (Note: Biddenden and Boundgate Road Act 1766 (6 Geo. 3. c. 93)) for amending and widening the Road from the Town of Biddenden (Note: Biddenden, Kent.) in the Weald of Kent, through the Towns of Smarden (Note: Smarden, Kent.) and Charing, (Note: Charing, Kent.) to join the Turnpike Road which leads from Ashford to Feversham, at a Place called Bound Gate. (Note: Boundsgate Corner, on the A251 Ashford Road, south of Badlesmere, Kent. 51°14′31″N 0°52′37″E) (Repealed by Biddenden and Boundgate Road (Kent) Act 1829 (10 Geo. 4. c. xxii))
| Doncaster Roads Act 1785 (repealed) | 25 Geo. 3. c. 104 | 8 March 1785 |
An Act for enlarging the Term and Powers of an Act made in the Fourth Year of the Reign of King George the Third, intituled, "An Act for amending and widening the Road from Tinsley, in the County of York, to the Town of Doncaster, in the said County." (Note: Tinsley and Doncaster Road Act 1764 (4 Geo. 3. c. 64)) (Repealed by Tinsley and Doncaster Turnpike Road Act 1826 (7 Geo. 4. c. lxxxix))
| Rotherham Roads Act 1785 (repealed) | 25 Geo. 3. c. 105 | 8 March 1785 |
An Act for enlarging the Term and Powers of an Act made in the Fourth Year of the Reign of King George the Third, intituled, "An Act for amending and widening the Road from the South End of the Town of Rotherham in the County of York, to the present Turnpike Road near Pleasley, in the County of Derby, and also the Road from the North End of the said Town of Rotherham into the present Turnpike Road on the East Side of Tankersley Park in the said County of York," (Note: Derby and Yorkshire Roads Act 1764 (4 Geo. 3. c. 65)) so far as the same relates to the Road leading from Rotherham aforesaid, to the Turnpike Road near Pleasley aforesaid. (Repealed by Rotherham and Pleasley Turnpike Road Act 1826 (7 Geo. 4. c. lxxxviii))
| Lancaster Roads Act 1785 (repealed) | 25 Geo. 3. c. 106 | 24 March 1785 |
An Act for reviving, continuing, and enlarging the Term and Powers of an Act, passed in the Third Year of the Reign of His present Majesty, (Note: Bolton and Nightingale's Road Act 1763 (3 Geo. 3. c. 31)) for repairing and widening the Road from a Place called Nightingales in the Township of Heath Charnock, to the Bridge at the West End of the Town of Bolton in the Moors, in the County Palatine of Lancaster. (Repealed by Nightingale's and Bolton Road Act 1805 (45 Geo. 3. c. xiv))
| Nottinghamshire Roads Act 1785 (repealed) | 25 Geo. 3. c. 107 | 24 March 1785 |
An Act for enlarging the Term and Powers of an Act, passed in the Fourth Year of the Reign of His present Majesty, King George the Third, intituled, "An Act for repairing and widening the Road from Derby to Mansfield in the County of Nottingham, and several other Roads therein mentioned." (Note: Nottinghamshire Roads Act 1764 (4 Geo. 3. c. 61)) (Repealed by Derby, Mansfield and Nuttall Roads Act 1830 (11 Geo. 4 & 1 Will. 4. c. xcv))
| Cornwall Roads Act 1785 (repealed) | 25 Geo. 3. c. 108 | 24 March 1785 |
An Act for continuing the Term of an Act, passed in the Fourth Year of the Reign of His present Majesty, intituled, "An Act for repairing and widening several Roads, leading from Callington in the County of Cornwall," (Note: Callington Roads Act 1764 (4 Geo. 3. c. 48)) and for widening and repairing the Road leading from Bushford to Beal's Mill in the Parish of Stoke Climsland, and also the Road from Penterscross in the Parish of Pillaton, to a Place called the Fighting Cocks in the Parish of Botes Fleming, all in the said County. (Repealed by Callington Roads (Cornwall) Act 1827 (7 & 8 Geo. 4. c. ci))
| Sussex Roads Act 1785 (repealed) | 25 Geo. 3. c. 109 | 24 March 1785 |
An Act for enlarging the Term and Powers of an Act, of the Fourth Year of His present Majesty, (Note: Sussex Roads Act 1764 (4 Geo. 3. c. 44)) for repairing the Roads from Horsham to the Top of Beeding Hill, and from Steyning to the Top of Steyning Hill, in the County of Sussex. (Repealed by Horsham and Steyning and Beeding Road Act 1828 (9 Geo. 4. c. lxx))
| Beverley to Kexby Bridge Road Act 1785 (repealed) | 25 Geo. 3. c. 110 | 6 April 1785 |
An Act for enlarging the Term and Powers of an Act passed in the Fourth Year of the Reign of His present Majesty (Note: Beverley and Kexby Bridge Road Act 1764 (4 Geo. 3. c. 76)) for repairing and widening the Road from Beverley to Kexby Bridge in the County of York. (Repealed by Beverley and Kexby Bridge Road (Yorkshire) Act 1828 (9 Geo. 4. c. lxxviii))
| Whitby and Middleton Road Act 1785 (repealed) | 25 Geo. 3. c. 111 | 25 April 1785 |
An Act for enlarging the Term and Powers of an Act passed in the Fourth Year of the Reign of His present Majesty, (Note: Whitby and Middleton Road Act 1764 (4 Geo. 3. c. 69)) for repairing and widening the Road from the West End of Baxter Gate, in the Town of Whitby, to the South End of Lockton Lane in the Parish of Middleton, in the County of York. (Repealed by Whitby and Middleton Road Act 1827 (7 & 8 Geo. 4. c. liii))
| Kent Roads (No. 2) Act 1785 (repealed) | 25 Geo. 3. c. 112 | 13 May 1785 |
An Act for continuing the Term and altering and enlarging the Powers of Two Acts of the Second (Note: Kent Roads Act 1762 (2 Geo. 3. c. 65)) and Ninth (Note: Kent Roads (No. 3) Act 1769 (9 Geo. 3. c. 76)) Years of His present Majesty, for repairing and widening the Roads from the White Post on Haselden's Wood in the Parish of Cranbrooke, to Appledore Heath, and from Milkhouse Street in the same Parish to Castleden's Oak in the Parish of Biddenden, and from the Turnpike Road in the Parish of Tenterden, through Rolvenden, to the Turnpike Road in the Parish of Newenden in the County of Kent. (Repealed by Road from Cranbrooke to Appledore Heath and Branches (Kent) Act 1829 (10 Geo. 4. c. lxxxviii))
| Leicester Roads Act 1785 (repealed) | 25 Geo. 3. c. 113 | 13 May 1785 |
An Act for enlarging the Term and Powers of an Act passed in the Fourth Year of His present Majesty's Reign, (Note: Leicester Roads Act 1764 (4 Geo. 3. c. 84)) for repairing and widening the Roads from Melton Mowbray in the County of Leicester, to the Guide Post in Saint Margaret's Field, Leicester, and from the Town of Leicester to the Town of Lutterworth in the said County, and other Roads therein mentioned. (Repealed by Melton Mowbray Road Act 1805 (45 Geo. 3. c. xlix) and Road from Leicester to Lutterworth Act 1805 (45 Geo. 3. c. lxxvii))
| Penryn and Redruth Roads Act 1785 (repealed) | 25 Geo. 3. c. 114 | 13 May 1785 |
An Act for enlarging the Term and Powers of an Act made in the Third Year of the Reign of His present Majesty, (Note: Penryn and Redruth Roads Act 1763 (3 Geo. 3. c. 52)) for amending and widening the Roads leading from New Street and Pig Street in Penryn, in the County of Cornwall, to Redruth in the same County. (Repealed by Penryn and Redruth Roads Act 1827 (7 & 8 Geo. 4. c. xviii))
| Warwick Roads Act 1785 (repealed) | 25 Geo. 3. c. 115 | 13 May 1785 |
An Act for repairing and widening the Roads leading from the Gibbet or Lutterworth Hand on the Watling Street Road through the Parishes of Churchover, Brownsover, Newbold upon Avon, Rugby, and Bilton in the County of Warwick, to the Turnpike Road between Dunchurch and Hillmorton in the said County, at or near a Public House known by the Sign of the Cock, in the said Parish of Bilton. (Repealed by Churchover, Brownsover, Newbold-upon-Avon, Rugby and Bilton Road Act 1828 (9 Geo. 4. c. lxxxviii))
| Ipswich to South Town Road Act 1785 (repealed) | 25 Geo. 3. c. 116 | 13 May 1785 |
An Act for amending and keeping in Repair the Road leading from Ipswich to South Town, and from the said Road at Beech Lane in the Parish of Darsham, to Bungay in the County of Suffolk. (Repealed by Road from Ipswich to Southtown and to Bungay Act 1828 (9 Geo. 4. c. xlv))
| Surrey and Sussex Roads Act 1785 (repealed) | 25 Geo. 3. c. 117 | 13 May 1785 |
An Act for more effectually repairing the Roads leading from the Stones End in Blackman Street in the Borough of Southwark, in the County of Surrey, to Highgate in the County of Sussex, and to Sutton and Kingston, and from Vauxhall Bridge through Stockwell to Brixton Causeway, and from Newingion to the East End of Peckham Lane, and from Camberwell Green to the Fox under the Hill in the County of Surrey; and for repealing so much of several Acts now in Force as relates to the said Roads; and for repairing the Road from Highgate aforesaid to Witchcross in the County of Sussex. (Repealed by Surrey and Sussex Roads Act 1802 (42 Geo. 3. c. lxxvi))
| Salop, Radnor and Montgomery Roads Act 1785 (repealed) | 25 Geo. 3. c. 118 | 13 May 1785 |
An Act for continuing the Term and altering and enlarging the Powers of an Act made in the Eighth Year of His present Majesty, (Note: Salop, Radnor and Montgomery Roads Act 1768 (8 Geo. 3. c. 51)) for amending and widening several Roads leading from the Town of Bishop's Castle and from Montgomery to the Turnpike Road at Westbury, and from Brockton to the Turnpike Road at Minsterley, in the several Counties of Salop, Radnor, and Montgomery; and for amending, widening, and keeping in Repair several other Roads in the Counties of Salop and Montgomery. (Repealed by Roads from Bishop's Castle, Montgomery and Brockton Act 1822 (3 Geo. 4. c. xlix))
| Bideford Roads Act 1785 (repealed) | 25 Geo. 3. c. 119 | 13 June 1785 |
An Act for continuing the Term and altering and enlarging the Powers of an Act of the Fourth Year of His present Majesty, (Note: Bideford Roads Act 1764 (4 Geo. 3. c. 87)) for repairing and widening several Roads leading from the Town of Bideford in the County of Devon. (Repealed by Bideford Roads Act 1824 (5 Geo. 4. c. cxv))
| Dumfries Roads Act 1785 (repealed) | 25 Geo. 3. c. 120 | 13 June 1785 |
An Act for enlarging the Term and Powers of an Act made in the Fourth Year of the Reign of His present Majesty, (Note: Dumfries and Roxburgh Roads Act 1764 (4 Geo. 3. c. 85)) for repairing and widening the Road from Scott's Dyke in the County of Dumfries, by or through the Villages of Langholm and Hawick to Haremoss in the County of Roxburgh. (Repealed by Road from Scots Dyke to Haremoss Act 1807 (47 Geo. 3 Sess. 1. c. xxiv))
| Derby Roads Act 1785 (repealed) | 25 Geo. 3. c. 121 | 13 June 1785 |
An Act for enlarging the Term and Powers of an Act made in the Fourth Year of the Reign of His present Majesty, intituled, "An Act for widening and repairing the Road leading from Ashborne in the County of Derby, over Belpar Bridge to the present Turnpike Road from Sheffield and Chesterfield to Derby, at or near a Place called Openwood Gate, and from Belpar Bridge to Ripley in the County of Derby." (Note: Derby Roads Act 1764 (4 Geo. 3. c. 82)) (Repealed by Ashbourne and Belper Bridge Road Act 1830 (11 Geo. 4 & 1 Will. 4. c. cxxx) (Note: Incorrectly cited as "11 Geo. 4 & 1 Will. 4. c. xxx" in the Chronological Table of the Statutes.))
| Glamorgan Roads Act 1785 (repealed) | 25 Geo. 3. c. 122 | 13 June 1785 |
An Act for enlarging the Term and Powers of an Act made in the Fourth Year of His present Majesty's Reign, intituled, "An Act for amending, widening, and keeping in Repair several Roads leading from the Town of Cardiff, and several other Towns and Places in the County of Glamorgan;" (Note: Glamorgan Roads Act 1764 (4 Geo. 3. c. 88)) and for making, altering, repairing, and widening certain other Roads within the said County. (Repealed by Roads in Glamorgan Act 1805 (45 Geo. 3. c. lxxiv))
| Lincoln Roads Act 1785 (repealed) | 25 Geo. 3. c. 123 | 13 June 1785 |
An Act to enlarge the Term and Powers of an Act passed in the Fourth Year of His present Majesty's Reign, (Note: Lincoln Roads Act 1764 (4 Geo. 3. c. 53)) for repairing and widening the Roads from the High Bridge in Spalding to a certain Place called Tydd Goat in the County of Lincoln, and from Sutton Saint Mary's to Sutton Wash in the said County. (Repealed by Spalding and Tydd Goat Road Act 1827 (7 & 8 Geo. 4. c. lvi))
| Middlesex and Essex Roads Act 1785 (repealed) | 25 Geo. 3. c. 124 | 13 June 1785 |
An Act for amending and keeping in Repair the Road from Whitechapel Church in the County of Middlesex, to Shenfield and the furthermost Part of the Parish of Woodford towards Epping, and from the Causeway in the Parish of Low Layton to the End of the said Parish of Woodford next Chigwell, and through the Parishes of Chigwell and Lambourn in the County of Essex, and for lighting and watching the said Road from Whitechapel Church to the Four Mile Stones in the Rumford and Woodford Roads. (Repealed by Middlesex and Essex Turnpike Roads Act 1823 (4 Geo. 4. c. cvi))
| Cheltenham Roads Act 1785 (repealed) | 25 Geo. 3. c. 125 | 4 July 1785 |
An Act for amending the Roads from a Place called Piff's Elm in the Tewkesbury Turnpike Road through Cheltenham to Elston Church, and from thence to Coombend Beeches, in the Road from Cirencester to Gloucester, and from the Market House in Cheltenham to the Burford Turnpike Road at a Place called Pewsdon Ash, and from Cheltenham to the Road from Gloucester to London, at or near a House called Kilkenny, and from the Direction Post in Bembridge Field, through Birdlip, to join the Road from Gloucester to Bath, at or near Painswick, and at a House called the Harrow, all in the County of Gloucester. (Repealed by Roads through Cheltenham Act 1824 (5 Geo. 4. c. c))
| Southampton Roads Act 1785 (repealed) | 25 Geo. 3. c. 126 | 4 July 1785 |
An Act for enlarging the Term and Powers of an Act made in the Fourth Year of the Reign of His present Majesty, (Note: Wiltshire and Hampshire Roads Act 1764 (4 Geo. 3. c. 47)) for repairing and widening the Roads from the End of Stanbridge Lane near a Barn in the Parish of Romsey, to the Turnpike Road at Middle Wallop, and from the Turnpike Road between Stanbridge Lane aforesaid, and Great Bridge, to the Turnpike Road at Stockbridge, and from the Garden of Henry Hattat at Awbridge, to the Garden Wall of Denys Rolle Esquire, at East Tuderley, and from Lockerley Mill Stream at East Dean Gate, and from the said Garden Wall to the Turnpike Road leading from Stockbridge aforesaid, in the County of Southampton to Salisbury. (Repealed by Romsey, Stockbridge and Wallop Roads Act 1827 (7 & 8 Geo. 4. c. lxi))
| Buckingham and Oxford Roads Act 1785 (repealed) | 25 Geo. 3. c. 127 | 4 July 1785 |
An Act to enlarge the Term and Powers of an Act passed in the Tenth Year of His present Majesty's Reign, (Note: Buckingham and Oxford Roads Act 1770 (10 Geo. 3. c. 58)) for amending the Road from Aylesbury, in the County of Buckingham, through Thame and Little Milton, to the Turnpike Road between Bensington and Shillingford in the County of Oxford, and for amending the Road from the Turnpike Road at Thame, to the Oxford Turnpike Road between Postcomb and Tetsworth in the said County of Oxford. (Repealed by Aylesbury and Thame Road Act 1833 (3 & 4 Will. 4. c. lxxxvi) and Thame Roads Act 1838 (1 & 2 Vict. c. xlvi) (Note: Incorrectly cited as "1 & 2 Vict. c. cxlvi" in the Chronological Table of the Statutes.))
| Banbury to Lutterworth Road Act 1785 (repealed) | 25 Geo. 3. c. 128 | 4 July 1785 |
An Act to enlarge the Term, and explain and amend the Powers of an Act passed in the Fifth Year of the Reign of His present Majesty, intituled, "An Act for repairing and widening the Road from the Turnpike Road in Banbury in the County of Oxford, through Daventry and Cottesbach, to the South End of Mill Field in the Parish of Lutterworth in the County of Leicester." (Note: Banbury to Lutterworth Road Act 1765 (5 Geo. 3. c. 105)) (Repealed by Banbury and Lutterworth Road Act 1828 (9 Geo. 4. c. lxxxvi))

=== Private acts ===
| Short title | Citation | Royal assent |
Long title
| Holden's Name Act 1785 | 25 Geo. 3. c. 1 Pr. | 8 March 1785 |
An Act to enable William Lucas Holden to take and use the Surname of Rose.
| Wiple's Naturalization Act 1785 | 25 Geo. 3. c. 2 Pr. | 8 March 1785 |
An Act for Naturalizing Charles Frederick Wiple.
| Van Hagen's Naturalization Act 1785 | 25 Geo. 3. c. 3 Pr. | 8 March 1785 |
An Act for Naturalizing Frederick Hendrick Van Hagen.
| Marston Montgomery (Derbyshire) Inclosure and Poor Rates Act 1785 | 25 Geo. 3. c. 4 Pr. | 24 March 1785 |
An Act for enclosing and leasing or letting a certain Common, and certain Waste Grounds, lying within the Parish of Marston Montgomery in the County of Derby, and applying the Profits thereof, in Aid of the Poors Rate, and other Parochial Taxes of the said Parish.
| South Cave Inclosure Act 1785 | 25 Geo. 3. c. 5 Pr. | 24 March 1785 |
An Act for dividing and enclosing, the several Open Common Fields, Common or Stinted Pastures, Wolds, Ings, Sands, Meadow Lands, and Waste Grounds, within the Township of South Cave in the East Riding of the County of York.
| Ashill Inclosure Act 1785 | 25 Geo. 3. c. 6 Pr. | 24 March 1785 |
An Act for dividing, allotting, and enclosing, the Common Fields, Half Year or Shack Lands, Commons, and Waste Grounds, within the Parish of Ashill in the County of Norfolk.
| Tamm's Naturalization Act 1785 | 25 Geo. 3. c. 7 Pr. | 24 March 1785 |
An Act for naturalizing Simon Tamm.
| De Luc Act's Naturalization 1785 | 25 Geo. 3. c. 8 Pr. | 24 March 1785 |
An Act for naturalizing John Andrew De Luc.
| Naturalization of Thomas Oom, Charles Bremer, and Daniel Dobbert Act 1785 | 25 Geo. 3. c. 9 Pr. | 24 March 1785 |
An Act for naturalizing Thomas Oom, Charles Frederick Bremer, and Daniel Philipp Dobbert.
| Viscount Falmouth's Estate Act 1785 | 25 Geo. 3. c. 10 Pr. | 25 April 1785 |
An Act to enable the Right Honourable George Evelyn Viscount Falmouth, and others, and the Guardians of their Issue Male, to make Leases of the Estates in Cornwall, devised by the Will of Hugh late Viscount Falmouth, deceased; and also to grant Sets and Leases of the Mines therein.
| Earl of Leicester's Estate Act 1785 | 25 Geo. 3. c. 11 Pr. | 25 April 1785 |
An Act for vesting certain Estates in the Counties of Kent and Somerset and in the City of London, devised by the Will of Thomas late Earl of Leicester deceased, in Trustees to be sold, and for laying out the Money arising there from in the Purchase of other Estates situate in the County of Norfolk, to be settled to the same Uses.
| Colerne Down Inclosure Act 1785 | 25 Geo. 3. c. 12 Pr. | 25 April 1785 |
An Act for dividing and enclosing the several Open and Common arable Fields, and the Down or Common called Colerne Down, within the Parish of Colerne in the County of Wilts.
| Egleston Inclosure Act 1785 | 25 Geo. 3. c. 13 Pr. | 25 April 1785 |
An Act for dividing and enclosing certain Parts of the Moors, Commons, and Waste Lands within the Manor of Egleston, in the County of Durham.
| Meriden Inclosure Act 1785 | 25 Geo. 3. c. 14 Pr. | 25 April 1785 |
An Act for dividing and enclosing the Common Fields, Common Meadows, Heath and Waste Lands lying within the Manor and Parish of Meriden in the County of Warwick, pursuant to an Agreement entered into for that Purpose.
| Wykeham and Ruston (Yorkshire, North Riding) Inclosures Act 1785 | 25 Geo. 3. c. 15 Pr. | 25 April 1785 |
An Act for dividing and enclosing the several Common Pastures, Commons or Waste Grounds within the Townships of Wykeham and Ruston in the Manor of Wykeham, in the North Riding of the County of York.
| Pemberton's Name Act 1785 | 25 Geo. 3. c. 16 Pr. | 25 April 1785 |
An Act to enable William Pemberton Esquire, and his First and other Sons, and their Issue, to take, use, and bear the Name and Arms of Cludde, pursuant to the Will of Edward Cludde Esquire, deceased.
| Lord King's Estate Act 1785 | 25 Geo. 3. c. 17 Pr. | 13 May 1785 |
An Act for vesting in Trust for Peter Lord King and his Heirs, the Inheritance in Fee-simple of a Message or Dwelling House in Dover Street in the County of Middlesex, devised and limited by the Will of Thomas Lord King, deceased, and for settling a Farm, Lands, and Hereditaments, in the County of Surrey, in Lieu thereof, to the Uses limited by the same Will.
| Bishop of Hereford's and Lord Sommers' Estates Act 1785 | 25 Geo. 3. c. 18 Pr. | 13 May 1785 |
An Act for confirming an Exchange agreed upon between the Lord Bishop of Hereford and the Right Honourable Charles Lord Sommers of certain Estates in the County of Hereford.
| Newnham's Estate Act 1785 | 25 Geo. 3. c. 19 Pr. | 13 May 1785 |
An Act for confirming a Mortgage made by John Newnham Esquire, of Part of his settled Estates in Sussex, pursuant to a Decree of the High Court of Chancery, and for enabling him to make a further Mortgage of his settled Estates according to such Decree, and for discharging both Incumbrances with the Produce of his Estates vested in Trustees to be sold.
| Winchester College and Blachford Estates Act 1785 | 25 Geo. 3. c. 20 Pr. | 13 May 1785 |
An Act for establishing and confirming an Agreement between the Warden and Scholars Clerks of Saint Mary College of Winchester near Winchester in the County of Southampton, and their Lessee, and Robert Pope Blachford Esquire, for Exchange of certain Grounds in the Parish of Whippingham in the Isle of Wight and County of Southampton aforesaid.
| Holt's Estate Act 1785 | 25 Geo. 3. c. 21 Pr. | 13 May 1785 |
An Act for vesting Two Thirty-six Shares of the Navigation of the River Douglas alias Asland in the County of Lancaster, Part of the settled Estates of Edward Holt Esquire, in Trustees to be sold, and for laying out the Moneys arising by such Sale in the Purchase of Lands and Hereditaments, to be settled in Lieu thereof to the same Uses.
| Wharton's Estate Act 1785 | 25 Geo. 3. c. 22 Pr. | 13 May 1785 |
An Act for vesting the Estates devised by the Will of Anthony Wharton Esquire, deceased, situate and being in the County of York, in Trustees to be sold for Payment of the Debts and Incumbrances affecting the same, and for laying out the Surplus of the Purchase-Money upon the Trusts and for the Purposes therein expressed.
| Lizard Common in Idsal or Shiffnal (Salop.) Inclosure Act 1785 | 25 Geo. 3. c. 23 Pr. | 13 May 1785 |
An Act for dividing and enclosing a certain Waste or Common called Lizard Common, within the Parish of Idsal otherwise Shiffnal in the County of Salop.
| Portsea Inclosure Act 1785 | 25 Geo. 3. c. 24 Pr. | 13 May 1785 |
An Act for dividing and enclosing the Commons and Waste Lands called Frodington otherwise Fraddington otherwise Fratton Common and South Sea Common and Wastes in the Guildable Part of the Parish of Portsea and County of Southampton.
| Kinnerley and Melverley (Salop.) Inclosures Act 1785 | 25 Geo. 3. c. 25 Pr. | 13 May 1785 |
An Act for dividing and enclosing the Common Fields and Waste Lands within the Manors of Kinnerley and Melverley in the County of Salop.
| Pickering and Newton (Yorkshire, North Riding) Inclosures Act 1785 | 25 Geo. 3. c. 26 Pr. | 13 May 1785 |
An Act for dividing and enclosing certain Commons and Waste Lands within the Townships of Pickering and Newton in the North Riding of the County of York.
| Holbrooke Inclosure Act 1785 | 25 Geo. 3. c. 27 Pr. | 13 May 1785 |
An Act for dividing and enclosing the Commons, Open Common Fields, Common Meadows, Commonable Lands and Waste Grounds within the Liberty of Holbrooke in the Parish of Duffield, in the County of Derby.
| Upper Clatford Inclosure Act 1785 | 25 Geo. 3. c. 28 Pr. | 13 May 1785 |
An Act for dividing and enclosing the Common Fields, Common Meadows, Waste Lands, and other Commonable Places within the Parish of Upper Clatford, in the County of Southampton.
| Osgathorpe Inclosure Act 1785 | 25 Geo. 3. c. 29 Pr. | 13 May 1785 |
An Act for dividing, allotting, and enclosing the Open and Common Fields and Common or Waste Land within the Lordship or Liberty of Osgathorpe in the County of Leicester.
| Bridgman's Name Act 1785 | 25 Geo. 3. c. 30 Pr. | 13 May 1785 |
An Act to enable John Simpson (lately called John Bridgeman) Esquire, and the Heirs Male of his Body to take and use the Surname of Simpson, pursuant to the Will of William Simpson Esquire, deceased, and also to bear the Arms belonging to the Family of Simpson.
| Earl of Aylesford's Estate Act 1785 | 25 Geo. 3. c. 31 Pr. | 13 June 1785 |
An Act for exchanging Part of the settled Estate of Heneage Earl of Aylesford, in the County of Kent, for another Estate of greater Value in the same County, to be settled in Lieu thereof.
| Lord Milton's Estate Act 1785 | 25 Geo. 3. c. 32 Pr. | 13 June 1785 |
An Act for vesting a Cottage or Tenement used as and for a School House, and other Hereditaments, in or near the Town of Milton in the County of Dorset in Joseph Lord Milton and his Heirs, in Lieu of or in Compensation for a Messuage or Tenement and Garden, situate and being in the Town of Blandford Forum, of greater Value.
| Shelley's Estate Act 1785 | 25 Geo. 3. c. 33 Pr. | 13 June 1785 |
An Act for vesting Part of the settled Estates, and such of the Estates of the Right Honourable Sir John Shelley Baronet, deceased, which upon his Death descended to his Son, Sir John Shelley Baronet, an Infant, as his Heir at Law, in Trustees for the Purposes within mentioned.
| Shaftoe's Charity Act 1785 | 25 Geo. 3. c. 34 Pr. | 13 June 1785 |
An Act for better regulating the Charity of John Shaftoe of Nether Warden in the County of Northumberland Clerk, deceased.
| Coxe's Estate Act 1785 | 25 Geo. 3. c. 35 Pr. | 13 June 1785 |
An Act for vesting certain detached Parts of the settled Estates of Henry Hippisley Coxe Esquire, in Somersetshire, in Trustees to be sold, and for laying out the Purchase-Money in other Estates to be settled to the same Uses, and for enabling the Tenants for Life to grant as well Leases of the Coal Mines as other Leases.
| Cotes's Estate Act 1785 | 25 Geo. 3. c. 36 Pr. | 13 June 1785 |
An Act for vesting Part of the settled Estates of John Cotes Esquire, in the Counties of Montgomery, Salop, and Stafford, in Trustees, to be sold for raising Money for Payment of Debts and Incumbrances affecting the same Estates, and for other Purposes therein mentioned.
| Hanmer's, Warren's, and Bunbury's Estates Act 1785 | 25 Geo. 3. c. 37 Pr. | 13 June 1785 |
An Act to effectuate a Partition of the Estates of Job Hanmer Esquire, the Reverend Erasmus Warren Clerk, and Sir Thomas Charles Bunbury Baronet, in the Counties of Suffolk and Essex.
| Topp's Estate Act 1785 | 25 Geo. 3. c. 38 Pr. | 13 June 1785 |
An Act for vesting Part of the Estates of John Topp Esquire, deceased, in the Counties of Salop and Montgomery, in Trustees, to be sold for Payment of his Debts and Legacies and the Costs of Suit, pursuant to the Directions of the Court of Chancery, and for discharging Part of the Estates so vested from a perpetual Yearly Rent Charge, and for subjecting Part of the said John Topp's devised Estates to the Payment thereof.
| Agnew's Estate Act 1785 | 25 Geo. 3. c. 39 Pr. | 13 June 1785 |
An Act for empowering the Judges of the Court of Session in Scotland to sell such Parts of the Estates of Barnbarroch and Sheuchan, lying in the County of Wigton and Stewartry of Kirkcudbright, belonging to Robert Agnew Esquire, as shall be sufficient for Payment of the Debts affecting either of those Estates, and for vesting the Remainder in Feetail to the same Heirs and under the same Limitations as are mentioned in the Deed of Entail thereof, bearing Date the Twenty-ninth Day of December One thousand seven hundred and fifty-seven.
| Maxwell's Estate Act 1785 | 25 Geo. 3. c. 40 Pr. | 13 June 1785 |
An Act for vesting the Estate of Drummodie and others, lying in the County of Wigton, in Sir William Maxwell of Munrieth Baronet, in Fee-tail, and for vesting in the said Sir William Maxwell, his Heirs and Assigns, in Fee-simple, the Estate of Little Killantrae and others, lying in the same County, in Lieu thereof.
| Clarke's Estate Act 1785 | 25 Geo. 3. c. 41 Pr. | 13 June 1785 |
An Act for vesting the undivided Moiety of the Freehold and Copyhold Estates of William Clarke Esquire, deceased, devised by his Will for the Benefit of his Daughter Mary Forbes and her Issue, in Trustees, for the Purposes within mentioned.
| Hon William Tollemache's and Others' Estates Act 1785 | 25 Geo. 3. c. 42 Pr. | 13 June 1785 |
An Act to enable the Honourable Wilbraham Tollemache and the several other Persons therein mentioned, to grant Building Leases of certain Parts of Lands and Hereditaments in the County Palatine of Chester, devised by the Will of the Right Honourable Lionel late Earl of Dysart, upon the Terms and Restrictions therein mentioned.
| Walwyn's Estate Act 1785 | 25 Geo. 3. c. 43 Pr. | 13 June 1785 |
An Act for vesting Part of the settled Estates of James Walwyn Esquire, in the County of Hereford, in the said James Walwyn in Fee-simple, and for settling other Estates of the said James Walwyn, in the said County, of greater Value, in Lieu thereof.
| Parnell's Estate Act 1785. | 25 Geo. 3. c. 44 Pr. | 13 June 1785 |
An Act for Sale of a sufficient Part of the Estates of Hugh Parnell, a Lunatic, for Payment of his Debts and Incumbrances, under the Direction of the Court of Chancery.
| Forton Inclosure Act 1785 | 25 Geo. 3. c. 45 Pr. | 13 June 1785 |
An Act for dividing and enclosing the Commons, Waste Grounds, and Moss, within the Hamlet or Township of Forton, in the County of Lancaster.
| Donnington-upon-Baine Inclosure Act 1785 | 25 Geo. 3. c. 46 Pr. | 13 June 1785 |
An Act for dividing and enclosing certain Open Common Fields, Meadows, Pastures, Ings, and other Commonable Lands and Waste Grounds within the Parish of Donnington-upon-Baine in the County of Lincoln.
| Wimborne Minster (Dorset) Inclosure and Drainage Act 1785 | 25 Geo. 3. c. 47 Pr. | 13 June 1785 |
An Act for dividing, allotting and enclosing the Open and Common Fields, Common Crofts, and Common Meadows, and for draining and improving certain Common Moors within the Parish of Wimborne Minster in the County of Dorset.
| Beverley, &c. Inclosure Act 1785 | 25 Geo. 3. c. 48 Pr. | 13 June 1785 |
An Act for dividing, enclosing and improving certain Lands, Grounds, Carrs, and Common Pastures in Woodmansey, Thearne, Weal, and Skidby, all in the Parishes of Saint John in Beverley and of Skidby in the East Riding of the County of York.
| Sidlesham Inclosure Act 1785 | 25 Geo. 3. c. 49 Pr. | 13 June 1785 |
An Act for dividing and enclosing an Open Waste or Common in the Parish of Sidlesham in the County of Sussex.
| Rothwell Haigh (Yorkshire, West Riding) Inclosure Act 1785 | 25 Geo. 3. c. 50 Pr. | 13 June 1785 |
An Act for dividing and enclosing a certain Open Tract of Land called Rothwell Haigh, within Rothwell, in the West Riding of the County of York.
| Collignon's Naturalization Act 1785 | 25 Geo. 3. c. 51 Pr. | 13 June 1785 |
An Act for naturalizing William Henry Collignon.
| Levi's Naturalization Act 1785 | 25 Geo. 3. c. 52 Pr. | 13 June 1785 |
An Act for naturalizing Barnard Levi.
| Beaumaris Free School Estate Act 1785 | 25 Geo. 3. c. 53 Pr. | 4 July 1785 |
An Act for vesting certain Messuages, Lands, and Hereditaments in the Parish of Llandegay, in the County of Carnarvon, belonging to the Trustees of the Free-School of Beaumaris, in the Right Honourable Richard Lord Penrhyn of the Kingdom of Ireland and his Heirs, upon certain Terms and Conditions therein mentioned.
| Borrett Estate Act 1785 | 25 Geo. 3. c. 54 Pr. | 4 July 1785 |
An Act for vesting a Fee Farm Rent belonging to Thomas Borrett Esquire and Martha his Wife, in the County of Bedford, comprised in a Settlement made upon their Marriage, in Trustees, to be sold, for the Purposes in the Act mentioned, and for vesting other Parts of their settled Estates, situate in the County of Kent, for the separate Use of the said Martha Borrett, and to other Uses the same as in the former Settlements thereof.
| John Smith's Will Act 1785 | 25 Geo. 3. c. 55 Pr. | 4 July 1785 |
An Act to enable Elizabeth Osborne, William Symonds, Thomas Symonds Powell, and John Moore Green, their Heirs or Assigns, to convey certain Lands and Hereditaments in the Parish of Clehonger in the County of Hereford, and which are now subject to the Trusts of the Will of the late John Smith Esquire, in Exchange for other Lands in the same County of greater Value, to be conveyed to and held by them respectively upon the Trusts of the said Will of the said John Smith.
| Foffont, Swallowclift, Ebesborne, Wake, Broadchalk, Bowerchalk, Alvedeston, Bishopston and Fifield (Wiltshire) Inclosures Act 1785 | 25 Geo. 3. c. 56 Pr. | 4 July 1785 |
An Act for dividing and allotting the Open and Common Lands and Grounds within the several Parishes of Fosfont, Swallowclift, Ebesborne, Wake, Broadchalk, Bowerchalk, Alvedeston, Bishopston, and Fifield, in the County of Wilts.
| Kilnwick Inclosure Act 1785 | 25 Geo. 3. c. 57 Pr. | 4 July 1785 |
An Act for dividing and enclosing the Open Arable Fields, Ings or Pasture Grounds and Common within the Township of Kilnwick in the Parish of Kilnwick, in the East Riding of the County of York.
| Inglis's Divorce Act 1785 | 25 Geo. 3. c. 58 Pr. | 4 July 1785 |
An Act to dissolve the Marriage of John Inglis Esquire with Ann Stewart his now Wife, and to enable him to marry again, and for other Purposes therein mentioned.
| Schrieber's Name Act 1785 | 25 Geo. 3. c. 59 Pr. | 4 July 1785 |
An Act to enable John Schricber Esquire, and the Heirs of his Body, to take and use the Surname and Arms of Lateward.
| Imhoff's Naturalization Act 1785 | 25 Geo. 3. c. 60 Pr. | 4 July 1785 |
An Act for naturalizing Charles Imhoff.
| Graumann's Naturalization Act 1785 | 25 Geo. 3. c. 61 Pr. | 4 July 1785 |
An Act for naturalizing Hermann Graumann.

=== Sources ===
- Pickering, Danby, ed. (1786). "Anno vicesimo quinto Georgii III". The Statutes at Large. Vol. 35. Cambridge: Charles Bathurst. pp. 1–428 – via Internet Archive.
- Pickering, Danby, ed. (1786). "Anno vicesimo quinto Georgii III". The Statutes at Large. Vol. 35. Cambridge: Charles Bathurst. pp. 1–428 – via Google Books.
- Journals of the House of Commons. Vol. 40. London: His Majesty's Stationery Office. 1803. pp. 453–1168 – via Google Books.
- Journal of the House of Lords. Vol. 37: 1783-1787. London: His Majesty's Stationery Office. 1830. pp. 176–383 – via British History Online.
- Chronological Table of and Index to the Statutes. Vol. 1: To the End of the Session 59 Vict. Sess. 2 (1895) (13th ed.). London: Her Majesty's Stationery Office. 1896. pp. 143–145 – via Google Books.
- Chronological Table of the Statutes: Covering the Period from 1235 to the End of 1971. London: Her Majesty's Stationery Office. 1972. pp. 165–167. ISBN 978-0-11-840096-1 – via Google Books.

== See also ==
- List of acts of the Parliament of Great Britain
