= Metropolitan Buildings Office =

The Metropolitan Buildings Office was formed in 1845 in order to regulate the construction and use of buildings in the metropolitan area of London, England. Surveyors were empowered to enforce building regulations which sought to improve the standard of houses and business premises, and to regulate activities that might threaten public health. In 1855 the assets, powers and responsibilities of the office passed to the Metropolitan Board of Works.

== Formation ==
Metropolitan Buildings Act 1844
- Act of Parliament
- Parliament of the United Kingdom
- Long title: An Act for regulating the construction and the use of buildings in the metropolis and its neighbourhood.
- Citation: 7 & 8 Vict. c. 84
- Territorial extent: United Kingdom

Dates
- Royal assent: 9 August 1844
- Commencement: 1 September 1844: Districts and Officers appointed; 1 January 1844: rest of act; (Note: Section 1.)
- Repealed: 25 August 1894
Other legislation
Amended by	Metropolitan Buildings Act 1846; Metropolitan Building Act 1855
Repealed by	London County Council (General Powers) Act 1894
Relates to	Fires Prevention Act 1838

Status: Repealed

Text of statute as originally enacted

The office was established by the Metropolitan Buildings Act 1844 (7 & 8 Vict. c. 84), with the following purposes:

- Improvement of drainage
- Securing sufficient width of streets to ensure adequate ventilation
- Regulation of explosive works
- Regulation of "deleterious" works
- To appoint officers to superintend the act

== Places under the act ==
The limits in which the act were to operate were defined as:

- On the north side of the River Thames the area within the external boundaries of the parishes of Fulham, Hammersmith, Kensington, Paddington, Hampstead, Hornsey, Tottenham, St Pancras, Islington, Stoke Newington, Hackney, Stratford-le-Bow, Bromley St Leonard, Poplar and Shadwell; and to the detached part of the parish of Chelsea north of Kensington.
- On the south side of the River Thames the area within the external boundaries of the parishes of Woolwich, Charlton, Greenwich, Deptford, Lee, Lewisham, Camberwell, Lambeth, Streatham, Tooting and Wandsworth.
- And all places within 200 yards (180 m) of the external boundaries of these parishes, except on the eastern part where the boundary was to be the River Lea.

The act recognised that London was expanding and provision was made to extend the act by Order in Council to any place within 12 miles (19 km) of Charing Cross.

== Administration of the Office ==
Authority to administer the act was given to the Lord Mayor and aldermen of the City of London and the justices of the peace for the counties of Middlesex, Surrey and Kent, the City and Liberty of Westminster and the Liberty of Her Majesty's Tower of London. The city corporation and the justices in quarter sessions were to divide their areas into districts, and to appoint district surveyors to superintend the act. The office's headquarters were established at 6 Adelphi Terrace.

The power of the district surveyors did not extend to certain buildings already under separate legislation. These were under "special supervision", being under the jurisdiction of specially appointed "official referees" who applied the provisions of the act. Buildings in this category included royal palaces, bridges, embankments, wharves, gaols and prisons, the Mansion House, the Guildhall, the Royal Exchange, the British Museum and Covent Garden Market.

In addition the buildings of dock and railway companies were completely exempt from the Building Act.

== Controls and regulation ==
The creation of the Office introduced a number of changes from 1 January 1845, including:

- Builders were required to give the district surveyor two days' notice if they were to construct a new building or alter an existing one.
- Regulations were to be enforced regarding the thickness of walls, height of rooms, the materials used in repairs, the dividing of existing buildings and the placing and design of chimneys, fireplaces and drains.
- All newly constructed houses were to have back yards of a minimum size.
- Streets were to be at least 40 feet (12 m) wide, or the width to be the same as the highest building in the street, whichever was the greatest.
- Any alley or mews was to be at least 20 feet (6.1 m) wide, or the width to be the same as the highest building in the alley, whichever was the greatest.
- Every alley was to have two entrances, one of which was to be open from the ground upwards.

== Abolition ==
By the Metropolis Management Act 1855 (18 & 19 Vict. c. 122) the powers of the Metropolitan Buildings Office passed to the newly created Metropolitan Board of Works.

The rest of the 1844 act was repealed by section 215 of, and the fourth schedule to, the London County Council (General Powers) Act 1894 (57 & 58 Vict. c. ccxii).
