= Tribunals, Courts and Enforcement Act 2007 =

Act of the Parliament of the United Kingdom

Tribunals, Courts and Enforcement Act 2007 (Note: Section 149.)
- Act of Parliament
- Parliament of the United Kingdom
- Long title: An Act to make provision about tribunals and inquiries; to establish an Administrative Justice and Tribunals Council; to amend the law relating to judicial appointments and appointments to the Law Commission; to amend the law relating to the enforcement of judgments and debts; to make further provision about the management and relief of debt; to make provision protecting cultural objects from seizure or forfeiture in certain circumstances; to amend the law relating to the taking of possession of land affected by compulsory purchase; to alter the powers of the High Court in judicial review applications; and for connected purposes.
- Citation: 2007 c. 15
- Introduced by: Vera Baird MP (Commons); Baroness Ashton, Secretary of State for Constitutional Affairs, 16 November 2006 (Lords)
- Territorial extent: England and Wales; Scotland; Northern Ireland; Isle of Man; (Note: Section 147.)

Dates
- Royal assent: 19 July 2007
- Commencement: 19 September 2007; Various; (Note: Section 148.)
Other legislation
Amends	Landlord and Tenant Act 1709; Inclosure Act 1845; Bills of Sale Act (1878) Amendment Act 1882; Sheriffs Act 1887; Deeds of Arrangement Act 1914; Law Commissions Act 1965; Administration of Justice Act 1969; Administration of Justice Act 1970; Courts Act 1971; Attachment of Earnings Act 1971; Misuse of Drugs Act 1971; Criminal Justice Act 1972; House of Commons Disqualification Act 1975; Industry Act 1975; Rent Act 1977; Judicature (Northern Ireland) Act 1978; Customs and Excise Management Act 1979; Magistrates' Courts Act 1980Limitation Act 1980; Senior Courts Act 1981; County Courts Act 1984; Reserve Forces (Safeguard of Employment) Act 1985; Channel Tunnel Act 1987; Town and Country Planning Act 1990; Courts and Legal Services Act 1990; Water Industry Act 1991; Water Resources Act 1991; Land Drainage Act 1991; Social Security Administration Act 1992; Social Security (Consequential Provisions) Act 1992; Tribunals and Inquiries Act 1992; Judicial Pensions and Retirement Act 1993; Value Added Tax Act 1994; Police Act 1996; Employment Tribunals Act 1996; Education Act 1996; Town and Country Planning (Scotland) Act 1997; Access to Justice Act 1999; Postal Services Act 2000; Land Registration Act 2002; Constitutional Reform Act 2005; National Health Service Act 2006
Repeals/revokes	Distress for Rent Act 1689; Sale of Farming Stock Act 1816; Deserted Tenements Act 1817; Metropolitan Police Courts Act 1840; Execution Act 1844; Landlord and Tenant Act 1851; Railway Rolling Stock Protection Act 1872; Law of Distress Amendment Act 1888; Law of Distress Amendment Act 1908
Amended by	Serious Crime Act 2007; Legal Services Act 2007; UK Borders Act 2007; Child Maintenance and Other Payments Act 2008; Finance Act 2008; Housing and Regeneration Act 2008; Employment Act 2008; Transfer of Tribunal Functions Order 2008; Borders, Citizenship and Immigration Act 2009; Revenue and Customs Appeals Order 2009; Transfer of Tribunal Functions (Lands Tribunal and Miscellaneous Amendments) Order 2009; Transfer of Functions of the Charity Tribunal Order 2009; Transfer of Functions of the Consumer Credit Appeals Tribunal Order 2009; Transfer of Functions (Estate Agents Appeals and Additional Scheduled Tribunal) Order 2009; Pensions Regulator Tribunal (Transfer of Functions) Act (Northern Ireland) 2010; Crime and Security Act 2010; Amendment to Schedule 6 to the Tribunals, Courts and Enforcement Act 2007 Order 2010; Transfer of Functions of the Asylum and Immigration Tribunal Order 2010; Transfer of Tribunal Functions Order 2010; Arbitration (Scotland) Act 2010 (Consequential Amendments) Order 2010; Public Bodies Act 2011; Charities Act 2011; Treaty of Lisbon (Changes in Terminology) Order 2011; Equality Act 2010 (Public Authorities and Consequential and Supplementary Amendments) Order 2011; Welfare Reform Act 2012; Legal Aid, Sentencing and Punishment of Offenders Act 2012; Financial Services Act 2012; Crime and Courts Act 2013; Enterprise and Regulatory Reform Act 2013; Public Bodies (Abolition of the Aircraft and Shipbuilding Industries Arbitration Tribunal) Order 2013; Amendments to Schedule 6 to the Tribunals, Courts and Enforcement Act 2007 Order 2013; Public Bodies (Abolition of Administrative Justice and Tribunals Council) Order 2013; Intellectual Property Act 2014; Crime and Courts Act 2013 (Family Court: Consequential Provision) Order 2014; Mines Regulations 2014; Criminal Justice and Courts Act 2015; Deregulation Act 2015; Courts Reform (Scotland) Act 2014 (Consequential Provisions and Modifications) Order 2015; Tax Collection and Management (Wales) Act 2016; Investigatory Powers Act 2016; Land Transaction Tax and Anti-avoidance of Devolved Taxes (Wales) Act 2017; Wales Act 2017; Additional Learning Needs and Education Tribunal (Wales) Act 2018; Data Protection Act 2018; Courts and Tribunals (Judiciary and Functions of Staff) Act 2018; Financial Services and Markets Act 2000 (Claims Management Activity) Order 2018; Coronavirus Act 2020; Sentencing (Pre-consolidation Amendments) Act 2020; Sentencing Act 2020; Public Service Pensions and Judicial Offices Act 2022; Commercial Rent (Coronavirus) Act 2022; Cultural Objects (Protection from Seizure) Act 2022; Judicial Review and Courts Act 2022; Nationality and Borders Act 2022; Criminal Justice Act 2003 (Commencement No. 33) and Sentencing Act 2020 (Commencement No. 2) Regulations 2022; Illegal Migration Act 2023; Levelling-up and Regeneration Act 2023; Judicial Review and Courts Act 2022 (Magistrates' Court Sentencing Powers) Regulations 2023; Planning (Consequential Provisions) (Wales) Act 2026; Crime and Policing Act 2026

Status: Amended

History of passage through Parliament

Text of statute as originally enacted

Revised text of statute as amended

The Tribunals, Courts and Enforcement Act 2007 (c. 15) is an act of the Parliament of the United Kingdom. It provides for several diverse matters relating to the law, some of them being significant changes to the structure of the courts and fundamental legal procedures. Part 1 provides a scheme for radical overhaul of the tribunal system in the UK, creating a new unified structure with two new tribunals to embrace the former fragmented scheme, along with a Senior President of Tribunals. Part 2 defines new criteria for appointment as a judge, generally reducing the length of experience required with the aim of increasing diversity in the judiciary. Part 3 creates a new system of taking control of goods in order to enforce judgments and abolishes ancient common law writs and remedies such as fieri facias, replevin and distress for rent. It introduces a modern system of 'certified enforcement agents' and 'exempted enforcement agents' which includes civil servants such as court officers and County Court bailiffs, civilian enforcement officers and police officers. Part 4 makes some changes to attachment of earnings and charging orders to make recovery of debts more straightforward. Part 5 makes some changes to insolvency practice in order to provide low-cost protection for people who have previously been excluded owing to their small debts and lack of assets. Part 6 provides protection from seizure for foreign antiquities and artefacts on display in the UK and whose provenance is alleged to be broken by misappropriation. Such artefacts can only be seized on a court order that was compelled by a Community obligation or a treaty obligation.

== Tribunals and inquiries ==
These provisions started to come into force on 19 September 2007. Though as of July 2008, no dates have been set for completing the process, the first tribunals under the new system are planned to sit from 3 November 2008.

=== Background ===
In the UK, tribunals have been created on an ad hoc basis to perform various judicial functions, for example Employment Tribunals and Asylum and Immigration Tribunals. The tribunals' members were a mixture of judges, lawyers, experts and laypeople, and were regulated by various government departments and bodies. Though these tribunals were supervised by, and had rights of appeal within, the Courts of the United Kingdom, reform was recommended to create a unified and simplified structure, better integrated into the courts system.

=== New tribunal structure ===
Section 1 of the act recognises legally qualified members of tribunals as members of the judiciary of the United Kingdom who are guaranteed continued judicial independence (s. 1).

Section 3 of the act creates two new tribunals to which existing jurisdictions will be transferred, a First-tier Tribunal and an Upper Tribunal. The tribunals are divided into several chambers, each to bring together a single subject matter, for example employment. Some tribunals will still lie outside the new system. All legally-qualified members will take the title of judge. There will be a right of appeal on a question of law from the First-tier to the Upper Tribunal and some limited jurisdiction for judicial review. The Upper Tribunal will be a senior court of record. There is a right of appeal to the Court of Appeal of England and Wales, Court of Appeal in Northern Ireland or Court of Session (Scotland) (s. 13). The first chambers within the First-tier Tribunal were planned to start sitting on 3 November 2008.

The act replaces the Council on Tribunals with an Administrative Justice and Tribunals Council and creates the office of Senior President of Tribunals, to be appointed by the Queen on the recommendation of the Lord Chancellor. (s.2/ Sch.1).

Chambers will be created flexibly by the Lord Chancellor in consultation with the Senior President of Tribunals and each will have its own Chamber President (s. 7/ Sch. 4).

Tribunal judgments will carry a right to a warrant of execution or entry on the Register of Judgments, Orders and Fines and will no longer require to be registered in the County Court or High Court (s. 27).

== Judicial appointments ==
These provisions started to come into force on 19 September 2007 and implementation was completed on 21 July 2008.

=== Background ===
In 2004, the Department of Constitutional Affairs consulted on means of increasing diversity among the judiciary in the UK. They concluded that the qualifications required to serve as a judge were a barrier to a broader judiciary and recommended that they be varied, in particular by shortening the period of legal practice demanded before seeking office. However, the consultation recognised the anomaly that a barrister or solicitor could seek office after a certain period of qualification, even had they never practised.

=== The judicial-appointment eligibility condition ===
The Act creates a judicial-appointment eligibility condition that a person (s.50(2)-(3)):

- Holds a relevant qualification; and
- Has gained experience in law for a specified period while holding a relevant qualification

Relevant qualification is as a barrister or solicitor (s. 50) though the Lord Chancellor can extend this to members of the Institute of Legal Executives or other bodies (s. 51). The specified periods for which a relevant qualification must be held are generally reduced to five or seven years from the previous respective seven or ten (Sch. 10). In particular, qualification for appointment as a District Judge requires five years' experience and, as a Circuit Judge, seven years.

Experience in law can be (s. 52):

- Judicial functions of any court or tribunal;
- Acting as an arbitrator;
- Practice or employment as a lawyer;
- Advising on the application of the law;
- Assisting persons involved in proceedings for the resolution of issues arising under the law;
- Acting as a mediator;
- Drafting documents intended to affect persons' rights or obligations;
- Teaching or researching law;
- Other activities of a broadly similar nature.

Sections 53-59 make various changes to the rules for appointing judges while section 60 requires that the chairman of the Law Commission is a judge of the High Court of England and Wales or the Court of Appeal of England and Wales.

== Enforcement by taking control of goods ==
As of April 2008 no dates have been set for the coming into force of these provisions.

=== Background ===
The previous system of warrants of execution and writs of fieri facias was increasingly considered as cumbersome, confusing and old-fashioned. Further, general concern about unlawful, violent and threatening behaviour by bailiffs led to a Department for Constitutional Affairs White Paper proposing modernisation and regulation.

=== Distress for rent ===
Section 71 abolishes the ancient common law self-help remedy of distress for rent, replacing it, solely for leases on commercial property, by a statutory system of Commercial Rent Arrears Recovery (CRAR) (ss. 72-87/ Sch. 14).

=== Enforcing judgments against goods ===
Writs of fieri facias are renamed writs of control. Warrants of execution and warrants of distress are renamed warrants of control. Writs of fieri facias de bonis ecclesiasticis are unaffected. (s. 62).

Section 65 abolishes the common law rules concerning:

- Distinctions between an illegal, an irregular and an excessive exercise of a power;
- Remedies available to the debtor;
- Replevin; and
- Rescuing goods. (Note: Rescuing goods refers to the actions of a person who interferes with goods seized.)

Schedules 12 and 13 create a new process of taking control of goods.

=== Enforcement agents ===
The Act replaces the ancient office of bailiff with that of enforcement agent (County Court bailiffs are still referred to as such). Section 63 of the Act restricts the role of enforcement agent to an individual who:

- Acts under a certificate under the Act. Certificates can be issued by various judges and the Lord Chancellor has the power to make regulations for the granting of certificates (s. 64).
- Is exempt because he acts in the course of his duty as:
  - A constable;
  - An officer of HM Revenue and Customs;
  - A person appointed under section 2(1) of the Courts Act 2003 (court officers and staff);
- Acts in the presence or under the direction of one of the above;
- Is exempt because he acts in the course of his duty as an officer of a government department.

Otherwise, a person who knowingly or recklessly purports to act as an enforcement agent is guilty of a summary offence and, on conviction, can be fined up to level 5 on the standard scale (s. 63(6) -(7)).

== Enforcement of judgments and orders ==
As of April 2008, no date is fixed for the coming into force of these provisions.

=== Background ===
Various problems were perceived to persist with the availability, quality and reliability of financial information from debtors. Attachment of earnings orders required the debtor to certify their own income and this was frequently misstated. Charging orders could not be made unless the debtor was in arrears with payments against the debt. This situation was perceived as offering opportunities for the debtor to dispose of valuable property while making modest instalments in the short term. Information hearings under Part 71 of the Civil Procedure Rules were widely perceived as ineffective.

=== Attachment of earnings orders ===
Section 91 and Schedule 15 amend the Attachment of Earnings Act 1971 to allow deductions to be made on the basis of a fixed rate, similar to the scheme already used for Council Tax arrears. Section 92 amends the 1971 Act to give the court the power to seek information on the details of a debtor's current employer from HM Revenue and Customs.

=== Charging orders ===
Section 93 amends the Charging Orders Act 1979 to enable charging orders to be made even though the debtor is not in arrears of an order for payment of the debt by instalments. However, sale can only be ordered if instalments are missed. Section 94 gives the Lord Chancellor the power to make regulations setting minimum limits on the value of debts where these provisions can be used to prevent their being invoked unfairly or vexatiously.

=== Information requests and orders ===
Sections 95 to 105 establish a system of applications for information whereby a creditor can apply to the court for an information order to obtain information about the debtor's means from the Department for Work and Pensions, HM Revenue and Customs, and third parties such as banks and credit reference agencies.

== Debt management and relief ==
As of April 2008, no date is fixed for the coming into force of these provisions.

=== Background ===
Consultation by the Department for Constitutional Affairs suggested that some people, especially those with small debts and few assets, were excluded from the existing schemes for insolvency protection. In particular, the schemes of Administration Orders (AOs) and Enforcement Restriction Orders (EROs) were seen to be deficient.

=== AOs, EROs and DROs ===
The act makes changes to the schemes for AOs and EROs so that they are available to a broader class of people in financial difficulties (ss. 106-107/ Sch. 16). Section 108 and Schedules 17 to 20 amend the Insolvency Act 1986 to create a new instrument of debt relief order (DRO). DROs are a low-cost scheme offered under narrow criteria for those currently excluded by the insolvency system. They will be administered by official receivers outside the courts' jurisdiction and will offer protection from creditors for a year. In 2007, it was estimated that there were 70,000 private, unregulated and unenforceable debt management schemes in operation in the UK. Sections 109 to 133 and Schedule 21 provide for a statutory system of Debt Management Schemes to regulate such practises.

== Protection of cultural artifacts ==
These provisions came into effect in England on 31 December 2007, in Scotland on 21 April 2008, and in Wales and Northern Ireland on 22 April 2008.

=== Background ===
The possibility that antiquities and cultural artifacts, sometimes allegedly misappropriated by their current custodians, would be seized by court order while on display in the UK, led to an increasing reluctance of foreign states and private individuals to allow loans for exhibitions. The provisions of the State Immunity Act 1978 were inadequate. Such uncertainties caused diplomatic tensions over a proposed loan of art works from Russia for an exhibition at the Royal Academy in December 2007. In particular, there was speculation that there might be attempts to seize Henri Matisse's The Dance which had been appropriated by the Bolshevik government from Sergei Shchukin during the Russian Revolution. The new provisions of this section of the Act came into force on 31 December and the Russian government gave permission for the paintings to travel to the UK and for the exhibition to go ahead on 9 January 2008.

=== Protection under the act ===
Section 135 defines the articles to be protected as those normally kept and owned outside the UK, lawfully imported for display or exhibition at an approved museum or gallery. The protection lasts for a maximum of 12 months, unless the article is damaged while in the UK and is undergoing repair, and protection only lasts while the article is:

- On public display in a temporary exhibition at a museum or gallery;
- Going to or returning from public display in a temporary exhibition at a museum or gallery;
- Undergoing related repair, conservation or restoration;
- Going to or returning from related repair, conservation or restoration;
- Leaving the UK.

Protected articles cannot be seized save under a court order made in the UK and which the court was required to make because of a Community obligation or treaty obligation, or a statute giving effect to a Community obligation or treaty (s. 136(1)). The Act does not provide immunity against prosecution for importing, exporting or otherwise dealing with the article (s. 136(2)). These provisions of the Act bind the Crown (s. 138).

== Bibliography ==
- "Explanatory Notes to Tribunals, Courts and Enforcement Act 2007". Office of Public Service Information. 2007.
