= Monetary judgment =

A monetary judgment (also called a money judgment or award) is a form of judgment rendered by a court or comparable determinative body in which one party to a dispute is awarded some amount of money as compensation for wrongdoing by the other party. Monetary judgments can contain a number of elements, including attorney's fees and punitive damages.

== Right to recover ==
When a court renders a judgment, it may state that the successful party has a right to recover money or property. However, the court will not collect the money or property on behalf of the successful party without further action. In common law legal systems, judgment enforcement is regulated by administrative divisions such as a province, territory, or federated state, while in civil law legal systems judgment enforcement is regulated through the national Code of Civil Procedure. Judgment enforcement, on a conceptual level, is conducted in a similar way across different legal systems. Specific references to the judgment enforcement rules of Germany, Canada (Saskatchewan), and the United States (California) are made in this section. In the Australian state of Victoria, the sheriff's office enforces unpaid money judgments in civil matters, with various enforcement powers against judgment debtors; they may seize and sell a debtor's assets to satisfy a judgment, place a wheel clamp on a debtor's car, or direct VicRoads to suspend a debtor's driver's license or vehicle registration.

The successful party may receive immediate payment from the unsuccessful party on the basis of the judgment and not require further action. A successful party who does not receive immediate payment must initiate a judgment enforcement process in order to collect the money or property that they are entitled to under the judgment. Once this process is initiated, the successful party may be referred to as the judgment creditor while the unsuccessful party will be referred to as the judgment debtor in North America.

Judgment creditors can register their judgments through the property registry system in their jurisdictions, levy the property in question through a writ of execution, or seek a court order for enforcement depending on the options available in their jurisdiction.

Judgment creditors may also need to investigate whether judgment debtors are capable of paying. Understanding whether a judgment debtor is capable of fulfilling the judgment order may affect the enforcement mechanism used to recover the money or property. Some steps are available in different jurisdictions to investigate or interview judgment creditors, and investigations may be conducted either by the judgment creditor or by a sheriff or bailiff.

Different enforcement mechanisms exist, including seizure and sale of the judgment debtor's property or garnishment. Some jurisdictions, like California, also allow for additional enforcement mechanisms depending on the circumstances, such as suspending the judgment debtor's driver's license or professional license. In Germany, a bailiff is responsible for enforcing the judgment and is empowered to use a number of different enforcement mechanisms.

In Germany, the judgment creditor is entitled to enforce the judgment 30 years past the judgment date. In California and Saskatchewan, the judgment creditor is entitled to enforce the judgment 10 years past the judgment date subject to exceptions that allow the judgment creditor to renew the enforcement for an additional 10 years.

== Release of judgments ==
Depending on the jurisdiction, the judgment debtor may be able to obtain a "satisfaction and release of judgment" document from the judgment creditor. This document affirms that the judgment debtor has fulfilled any obligations relating to the judgment.

For example, in California, a judgment creditor must file an "Acknowledgment of Satisfaction of Judgment" where it has been paid in full by the judgment debtor within 15 days of the judgment debtor's request. This document has the effect of formally closing the case and terminating any ongoing garnishment arrangements or liens. In Saskatchewan, upon either the satisfaction or withdrawal of a judgment, a judgment debtor can seek a discharge of judgment. If successful, the judgment is removed from the Judgment Registry and detached from any property registered on the Personal Property registry, titles, or interests in land.

== Offsets ==
An offset in law, is a reduction in the amount of a judgment granted to a losing party based on debts owed by the prevailing party to the losing party. For example, if an employee successfully sued an employer for wrongful termination, the employer might be entitled to an offset if the employer could demonstrate that it had previously made an overpayment to that employee which had not been returned. A party may similarly be entitled to an offset where it can demonstrate that the prevailing party has already received compensation for its injuries through insurance, a judgment against another party liable for those injuries, or some other source.
