= Warrant of execution =

A warrant of execution is a form of writ of execution used in the County Court in England and Wales (only). It is a method of enforcing judgments and empowers a County Court bailiff to attend a judgment debtor’s (hereafter, debtor) address to take goods for sale. The closest equivalent in Scotland is a charge for payment, executed by sheriff officers after a decree (a Scots Law judgment) is granted in a sheriff court in favour of a pursuer (claimant) seeking recovery of a debt or other sum due.

== Procedure ==
An application for a warrant of execution can be made by the judgment creditor (hereafter, creditor) at any point following the entry of judgment.

The request can be made for any amount up to the outstanding value of the judgment along with an application for the costs of requesting the warrant.

A warrant of execution can be issued in the County Court to recover a debt between £50 (£600 if the debtor is in Scotland) and £5,000. If amount sought is more than £600 it can be enforced in the High Court using a writ of control.

The value of the warrant will calculated by adding the amount of the request, plus the court fee and creditor's costs (if granted).

As the warrant can only be sought on a judgment debt of £5,000 or less, statutory interest is not recoverable.

Upon issue of the warrant the court will transfer the case to the debtor's local court and write to the debtor informing them of the warrant. The debtor is currently given seven days to pay the amount of the warrant without further action; if the defendant pays within this time, the warrant is cancelled and the money is sent by the court to the creditor.

Should the defendant fail to pay, the bailiff will visit the premises of the defendant, usually within fifteen working days, and attempt to identify items which can be sold at auction to recoup the outstanding debt, subject to the restrictions below. Such items are usually removed and stored, the storage costs being added on to the outstanding balance. The items are auctioned, usually without a reserve price, and the resulting amount (less auctioneer fees) is paid to the creditor.

If there is still an outstanding balance, the bailiff may again visit and seize further goods or assets.

Instead of actually removing goods, the bailiff can take payment from the debtor or agree to return later to allow the debtor to gather funds. If the debtor agrees to pay later the bailiff may take walking possession of goods as a surety of payment.

== Right of entry ==
The warrant grants limited rights of entry to the bailiff depending on the type of property and whether the bailiff has already successfully visited the debtor.

=== Residential property ===
A bailiff can only enter using peaceable means unless they have a High Court writ giving them the right to force entry. When forcing entry they must have a locksmith and police officer present and cannot force entry themselves. The locksmith can break into a locked door and if the debtor attempts to bar entry then the police officer can remove them or the bailiff can use reasonable force to remove them.

Peaceable entry means that they cannot push past the debtor to get in though an open door, they cannot get in though an open window (the law previously allowed them to do so), they cannot climb over fences or locked gates; they can only gain entry though an unlocked door or unlocked gate. Gaining entry to the land (i.e. the garden) does not give them permission to force entry into the property. They do not require permission to enter the property.

If the bailiff has previously been admitted and is returning to collect payment or goods to be sold, then they have a right of entry to residential property even if the occupants refuse to let them in. In this case they can force entry.

=== Business premises ===
If there is no living accommodation attached and the bailiff has good reason to believe the debtor has goods inside, they may force entry to business premises.

== Goods that cannot be seized ==
Social policy considerations, particularly the requirements enshrined in the overriding objective of the Civil Procedure Rules 1998, currently limit the goods which the bailiff may take.

The goods must currently meet the following criteria:

- The goods or items are required by the debtor to carry out business; examples of this are a tradesman's tools or reference books
- Essential household items which the debtor and their family require such as clothing or bedding
- Items which do not belong to the debtor; for example items that are subject to a hire purchase agreement, leased or rented from a third party. Goods that are joint owned by the debtor can be seized.
- Goods already marked for seizure by another bailiff dealing with a different warrant

As the warrant is a specific sanctioned interference with the debtor's general right to enjoyment of his property any question as to whether goods are or are not available for seizure is likely to be determined in the Defendant's favour.

== Suspending a warrant ==
The defendant may apply for the warrant to be suspended; this application must state reasons, for instance an offer to pay by instalments, and usually requires payment of a fee. The court will inform the creditor of the application and require them to confirm whether they agree to the suspension and if not to state why and, in the case of an offer, what they would accept.

If the suspension is contested the court will list the application for a hearing. The court will there decide whether the warrant should be suspended, and whether terms attach to the suspension. The court is not bound by the party's suggested payment regimes.

== Duration of a warrant ==
Warrants last for a period of one year from the date of issue. In some cases, a fee can be paid to extend the warrant's life beyond one year, but the creditor must supply the court with sufficient reason for such an extension to be granted, and - unless there are exceptional circumstances - apply before the warrant expires.
