= Certificated enforcement agent =

A certificated enforcement agent is a person appointed under Part 3 of the Tribunals, Courts and Enforcement Act 2007 in England and Wales, who may take control of goods and sell them to pay an amount of money when ordered to do so by a court. Until 2014, they were known as "certificated bailiffs".

== History ==
The Tribunals, Courts and Enforcement Act 2007 significantly reformed the process for taking control of goods in order to recover debts owed as a result of court judgments. This process requires a person to be an "enforcement agent" in order to exercise the powers it provides. Under section 63 of the Act, a person is an enforcement agent if they hold a certificate issued by a court (a "certificated enforcement agent"). In addition, police constables, court officers, officers of Her Majesty's Revenue and Customs and people authorised to act on behalf of the Welsh Revenue Authority, and officers of government departments can act as enforcement agents without needing to hold a certificate. The Act therefore abolished the role of a "non-certificated bailiff", and "certificated bailiffs" became certificated enforcement agents.

== Certification ==
A person may acquire a certificate to act as an enforcement agent under a procedure laid down by the Certification of Enforcement Agents Regulations 2014. This involves making an application to the County Court. A judge then considers the application and issues a certificate if he is satisfied that the person:

- is a fit and proper person to hold a certificate;
- possesses sufficient knowledge of the law and procedure relating to powers of enforcement by taking control of goods and of commercial rent arrears recovery to be competent to exercise those powers;
- has lodged a security of £10,000, in case he is required to pay any costs, fees or fines, or compensation for improperly exercising his office, and
- is not involved in buying debts (debt collection).

Once issued, the name of the enforcement agent is added to the national register, and their certificate is valid for two years, following which it must be re-applied for.

== Role ==
The functions of an enforcement agent are laid down by the Taking Control of Goods Regulations 2013. The regulations reformed the ancient law of distress (distraint), providing a set of codified, written rules concerning the process used for taking control of goods and, if necessary, their sale at auction to recover amounts of money owed by debtors.

== See also ==
- Bailiff
