= Nulla bona =

Nulla bona is a Latin legal term meaning "no goods". A sheriff writes this when he can find no property to seize to pay off a court judgment. Synonymous with return nulla bona, it denotes the return of a writ of execution signifying that the officer made a strict and diligent search but was unable to find any property of the defendant liable to seizure under the writ, whereof to make a levy.

It may also be used as a plea by a garnishee, denying that he holds property of, or is indebted to, the defendant.

The nulla bona is issued by the Master of the High Court if after the issue of a warrant of execution, the attached property of the debtor is found to be insufficient to suffice for the payment of creditors.
