= Swadif v Dyke =

South African legal case

Swadif (Pty) Ltd v Dyke NO is an important case in South African contract law, especially in the area of novation. It was heard in the Appellate Division by Wessels JA, Muller JA, Miller JA, Joubert JA and Trengove AJA on 15 September 1977, with judgment handed down on 22 November.

Whatever the grounds on which the rescission of a judgment may be sought at common law, it is abundantly clear, the court found, that at common law any cause of action relied on as a ground for setting aside a final judgment, must have existed at the date of the final judgment. There must be some causal connection between the circumstances which give rise to the claim for rescission and the judgment. If a judgment is obtained in respect of a disposition not for value, no ground exists for setting aside such judgment merely because the disposition was not made for value and it is proved that, immediately after such disposition, the judgment debtor's liabilities exceeded his assets. It is only if insolvency or liquidation supervenes that such a disposition acquires legal significance by reason of the provisions of section 26 of the Insolvency Act, read with, in the case of a company, section 181 of the Companies Act But it does not follow that a judgment in respect of such a disposition can on that account be set aside under common law, for, when the judgment was granted, no grounds existed for setting it aside. The court was fully entitled to grant the judgment on all the facts, and the causa which existed at the date of the judgment.

A judgment, as such, is not a disposition "made by an insolvent," as contemplated by the Insolvency Act. In a case where the only purpose of taking judgment is to enable the judgment creditor to enforce his right to payment of the debt under a mortgage bond, by means of execution, if need be, it seems realistic, and in accordance with the views of the Roman-Dutch writers, to regard the judgment not as novating the obligation under the bond, but rather as strengthening or reinforcing it.

The court held that a trustee or liquidator is not privy to the insolvent or to the company in liquidation. He is not bound by any judgment against the insolvent or the company to which he was not a party, and a plea of res judicata cannot be raised against him in respect of such a judgment because he does not derive his authority from the insolvent or the company; he has an independent right of action under the Insolvency Act.

Accordingly, where the liquidator of a company claimed an order setting aside a mortgage bond and an order for the cancellation of the bond on the ground that the bond constituted a disposition without value in terms of section 26 of the Insolvency Act, read with section 181 of the Companies Act, the Court held that a plea of res judicata, founded on the fact that the creditor had obtained a final judgment against the company based on the mortgage bond, could not be successful if raised against the liquidator.

The decision in the South West Africa Division, in Dyke NO v Swadif (Pty.) Ltd, was thus confirmed in part and reversed in part.

== See also ==
- Contract
- South African contract law
