= Fieri facias =

Type of writ in English law

A fieri facias, usually abbreviated fi. fa. (Latin for that you cause to be made), is a writ of execution after judgment obtained in a legal action for debt or damages for the sheriff to levy on goods of the judgment debtor.

The term is used in English law for such a writ issued in the High Court. Some jurisdictions in the United States also employ this writ, such as the Commonwealth of Virginia.

== England and Wales ==
It is addressed to the sheriff or High Court enforcement officer, and commands him to make good the amount out of the goods of the person against whom judgment has been obtained.

Fieri facias writs could be obtained in England and Wales to enforce judgment debts (both High Court and County Court) in excess of £600. In April 2014, the writ was renamed a writ of control as part of the Tribunals, Courts and Enforcement Act 2007. (The exception being fieri facias de bonis ecclesiasticis, which concerns seizure of ecclesiastical property.)

This writ was once so common that fieri facias became a slang term for a sheriff, with a pun on the "fiery [ruddy] face" of habitual drunkenness, or for anyone with a ruddy complexion.

== Ireland ==
In the Republic of Ireland, fieri facias is used to describe a High Court Judgment against property, which permits a sheriff or county registrar to seize goods.

== Hong Kong ==
Hong Kong statute (High Court Ordinance (Cap 4) s 21D(1)) provides that money and banknotes, government stock, bonds and other securities for money are amenable to attachment and sale though fieri facias. But with reference to the English case Alleyne v Darcy (1855) 5 I Ch R 56, securities for money do not include life insurance policies.

== United States ==
Under U.S. law a judgment creditor could file a fi. fa. with the land records of the locality in which the debtor is believed to own real property. Even though the sheriff may not actually foreclose on the property, the recorded fi. fa. will act as an encumbrance on the title of the property, which can prevent the property from being sold or refinanced without satisfying the related judgment.
