= Certificated bailiff =

In the United Kingdom, Certificated bailiffs were employees by private companies empowered to enforce a variety of debts on behalf of organisations such as local authorities. They were abolished in 2014, when they were replaced with certificated enforcement agents.

== Powers ==
They could seize and sell goods to cover the amount of the debt owed. They also held a certificate, which enabled them, and them alone, to levy distress for rent, road traffic debts, council tax and non-domestic rates. They could not enforce the collection of money due under orders of the High Court or the County Court.

== See also ==
- Bailiff
