= Attachment of earnings =

Attachment of earnings is a legal process in civil litigation by which a defendant's wages or other earnings are taken to pay for a debt. This collections process is used in the common law system, especially Britain and the United States, but in other legal regimes as well.

Ballentine's Law Dictionary notes that this process is not literal, whereby a "person's property is figuratively brought into the court."

== United Kingdom ==
In England, an attachment of earning order can stop money being paid to a defendant.

Under English law, somebody who is self-employed, unemployed, or a member of the armed forces cannot have an attachment against them.

In England, the District Council can attach earnings.

== United States ==
At present four U.S. states — North Carolina, Pennsylvania, South Carolina and Texas — do not allow wage garnishment at all except for debts related to taxes, child support, federally guaranteed student loans, and court-ordered fines or restitution for a crime the debtor committed. Several other states observe maximum thresholds that are lower than the 25 percent maximum provided by federal law. States may also prohibit garnishment altogether in certain circumstances. For example, in Florida the wages of a person who provides more than half the support for a child or other dependent are exempt from garnishment altogether (though this exemption is subject to waiver).

In New York, a limit of 10 percent of gross earnings may be taken for ordinary debts.

In many American jurisdictions, attachment of earnings is treated the same as, or is just called, garnishment. This is when either earnings, and/or property may be taken by the court.

== See also ==
- Attachment (law)
- Bankruptcy
- Distraint
- Contract
- Garnishment
- Tax refund interception
- Judgment
- Sheriff
- Working under the table
