= Ex tempore decision =

Type of judgment

Ex tempore (Latin for "out of the moment“) is a law latin legal term that means "at the time". A judge who hands down a decision in a case soon or straight after hearing it is delivering a decision ex tempore. Another way a judge may deliver a decision is to reserve their decision and deliver it later in written form. An ex tempore judgment, being off the cuff, does not entail the same preparation as a reserved decision. Consequently, it will not be thought out to the same degree.

In Australia, intermediate-level courts tend to have a heavy case load, and so many decisions are delivered ex tempore for reasons of time and necessity. Because many decisions of intermediate-level courts are ex tempore, those decisions are not binding on inferior courts as a matter of stare decisis. For example, in New South Wales, the District Court's decisions are not binding on the Local Court.

Ex tempore decisions are not binding on later courts due to the quick nature of their delivery after the hearing of a case. Therefore, these decisions are of persuasive authority only and a later court, dealing with a case of similar facts, can reach a different conclusion if it is appropriate and the court in question believes that their decision is more suitable.

== See also ==
- Appeal
- Curia advisari vult
- Sub judice
- Pro tempore
