= Peter Schwingen =

German painter

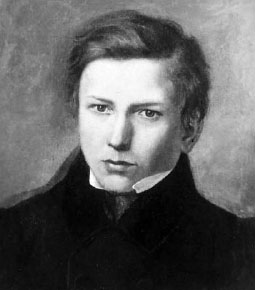
Self-portrait as a teenager

Peter Schwingen (14 October 1813, Muffendorf, now a district of Bonn - 6 May 1863, Düsseldorf) was a German genre and portrait painter; associated with the Düsseldorfer Malerschule.

== Life and work ==
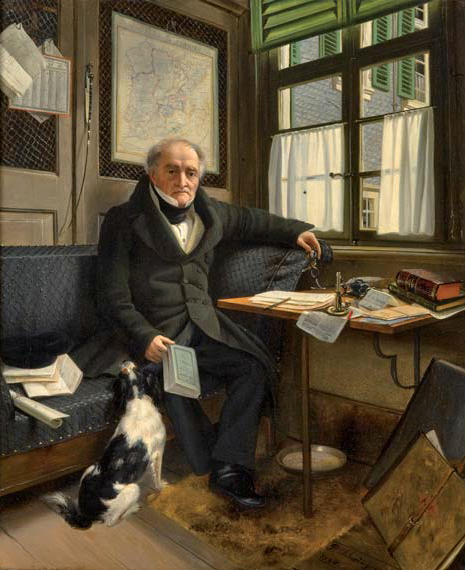
Portrait of Peter de Weerth

He was the son of a small farmer who also worked as a watchman. At the age of nineteen, thanks to a grant from the Prussian government, he was able to enroll at the Kunstakademie Düsseldorf. His instructors there included Karl Ferdinand Sohn, Theodor Hildebrandt and Friedrich Wilhelm von Schadow. His marks at the academy were mostly average. In 1837, shortly before the birth of his daughter, Caroline, he married Magdalene Schmitz, his landlord's daughter.

He first became known for his atmospheric paintings depicting St. Martin's Eve. Soon, he soon received numerous orders from throughout the region; developing his own style of portraits, which included detailed interiors, inspired by Dutch Golden Age paintings. His portrait characterizations were also inspired by the works of Heinrich Christoph Kolbe. This combination produced an important record of bourgeois domestic life, in the decade leading up to the revolutions of 1848. Perhaps his best known work of this type is a portrait of the Elberfeld merchant and landowner, Peter de Weerth. He would eventually produce about fourteen portraits of Weerth, his family, and friends.

His genre scenes are largely devoted to his native rural environment. His early themes were highly varied. Leading up to the revolutions, they took on a more political tone; notably in The Distraint and Return from the Fields. In his later years, he focused on large formats, and earned a considerable income form their sales, which allowed him to maintain a fine apartment for his family. It appears he did not die "poor and forgotten" as early biographies assert. He is believed to have created approximately 200 paintings, of which 150 are accounted for.

The art historian, Walter Cohen, was the first to research his works. The Peter-Schwingen-Gesellschaft in Bad Godesberg is dedicated to researching and publishing his works, and he is now considered a major artist of the Düsseldorf school.

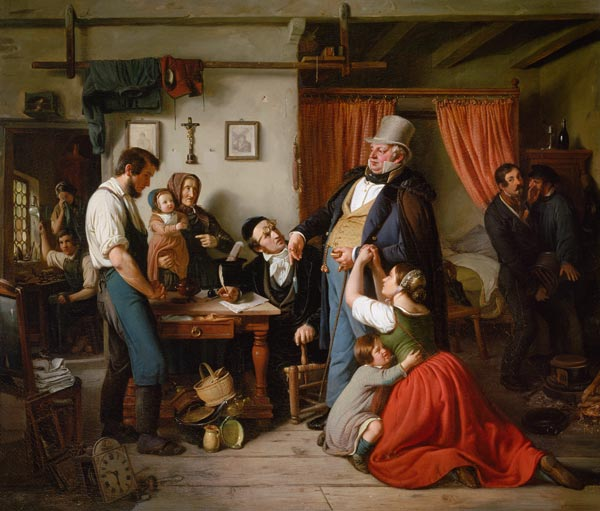
The Distraint
