= Curia advisari vult =

Curia advisari vult is a Latin legal term meaning "the court wishes to consider the matter" (literally, "the court wishes to be advised"), a term reserving judgment until some subsequent day. It often appears in case reports, abbreviated as "Cur. adv. vult", or sometimes "c.a.v." or "CAV", when the bench takes time for deliberation after hearing counsel's submissions.

In the case under consideration, the effect of the order is that nothing is adjudged and the Court will relist the matter to deliver judgment but may hear further argument. The court remains seized of jurisdiction and may make further interlocutory orders, for example, to prevent a party from dealing with an asset which may be the subject of litigation or may be sold in satisfaction of a judgment debt; counsel remain under the duty to the court not to withhold relevant law and, if counsel becomes aware of a relevant authority, must seek to relist the matter for further argument.

If the case is being used as a precedent, a decision given after an adjournment may be given more weight than a decision given orally immediately at the close of argument (Latin: ex tempore).

The term was not used in the reports of the House of Lords. Instead, an expression such as "Their Lordships took time to consider", or "Their Lordships took time for consideration" will be found. In the Scottish courts, the word avizandum is used similarly.

== See also ==
- List of Latin legal phrases
- Ex tempore
- Reserved decision
