= Committal procedure =

Replacement of earlier grand jury process under common law (except in US)

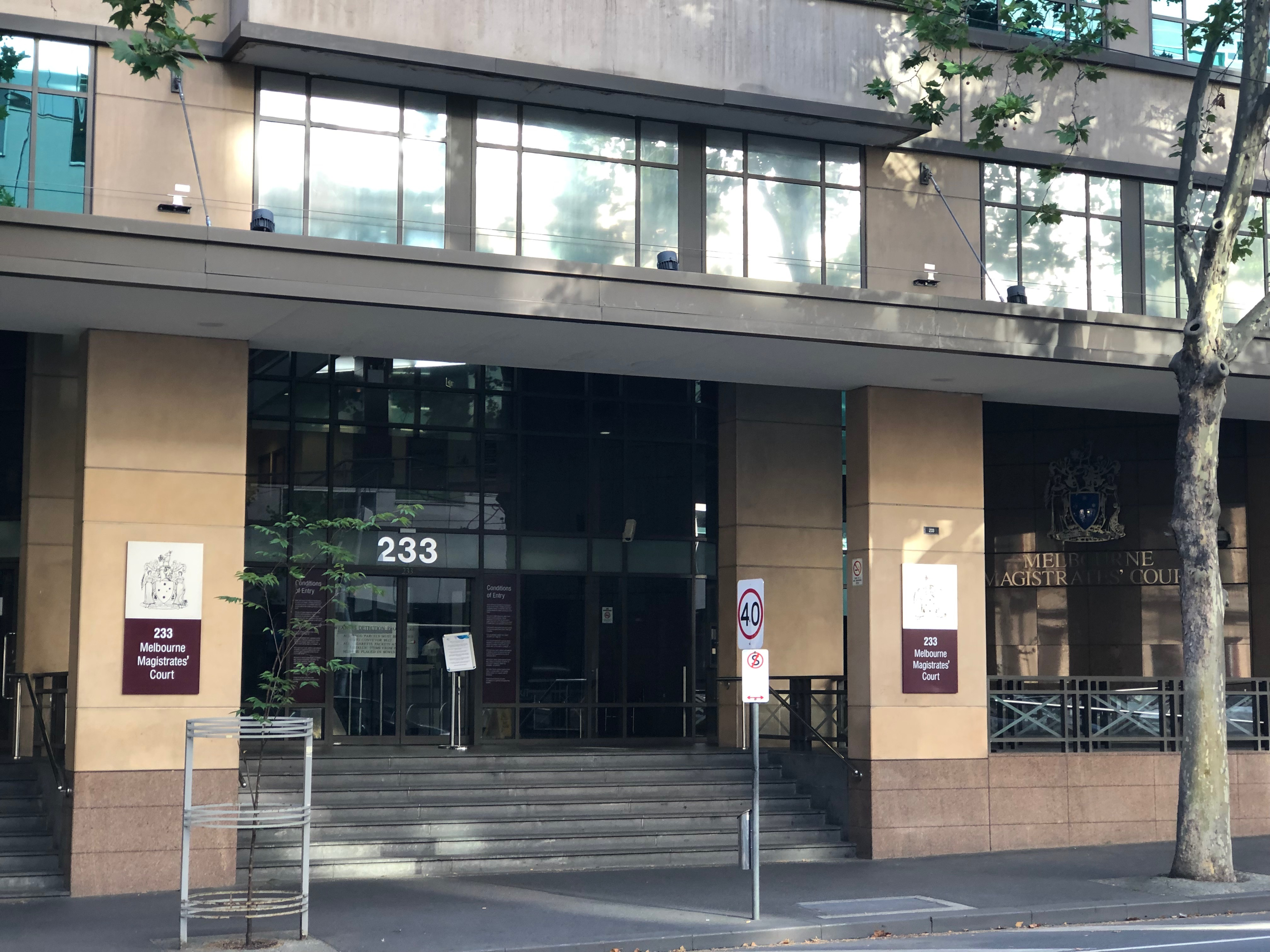
The Melbourne Magistrates' Court. In Victoria, Australia, all committal procedures take place in the Magistrates' Court

In law, a committal procedure is the process by which a defendant is charged with a serious offence under the criminal justice systems of all common law jurisdictions except the United States; which, instead, retains the earlier grand jury process.

Sometimes the committal procedure includes a preliminary hearing, sometimes it does not.

In most jurisdictions criminal offences fall into one of three groups:

There are less serious (summary) offences which are usually heard without a jury by a magistrate. These are roughly equivalent to the older category of misdemeanors (terminology that is now obsolete in most non-U.S. jurisdictions).

There are intermediate offences which are indictable (equivalent to an old-style felony), but which can be heard summarily. For instance, theft is usually a serious offence. If however the charge is that the defendant stole a packet of biscuits worth only a very small amount, it would probably be heard by a magistrate. In Canada and Ireland, these are known as hybrid offences, whereas in England and Wales, these are known as either way offences, and can only be heard summarily with the defendant's consent and if a magistrates' court finds that matter is suitable for summary trial. In Victoria, Australia, they are called indictable offences triable summarily. As well as the defendant's consent the Magistrate must regard the offence as appropriate to be heard in the lower court.

Finally, there are serious matters which must be dealt with in the higher courts, usually before a jury. When one is charged with an offence of the third type, a preliminary hearing is first held by a magistrate to determine whether there is sufficient evidence to warrant committing the defendant for trial. That is, whether there is sufficient evidence such that a properly instructed jury could (not would) find the defendant guilty. It is a very low-level test. The majority of committal proceedings result in a committal to trial.

In some jurisdictions, the prosecuting authority may directly present a defendant for trial regardless of the result of the committal proceedings by filing an ex officio indictment. Equally, the prosecuting authority usually has the power to stop any prosecution by entering a nolle prosequi. In many jurisdictions the right of a defendant to cross-examine witnesses during the committal is reliant on the defence establishing that it is in the interests of justice or to illuminate some relevant point. The defence very rarely calls witnesses at a committal.

== England ==
On 28 May 2013 the committal procedure was abolished in England. As a result, the serious matters are sent straight to the Crown Court from a magistrates' court for a pre-trial hearing. There is no committal procedure to determine sufficiency of evidence. Instead, the defendant charged with the offence may make an application to the Crown Court to have the case dismissed for lack of evidence. The idea behind this reform was to get cases to trial more quickly and reduce the number of pre-trial hearings. However, it is questionable whether this has been achieved given the number of pre-trial hearings that are often required in the Crown Court.

The first hearing in the Crown Court will be a Plea and Trial Preparation Hearing (PTPH), where a plea is taken and, if not guilty, a timetable for trial is set and directions given for service of further evidence, followed by the trial itself. There may be additional hearings in between (called 'mentions'). The PTPH was introduced on 5 January 2016 and replaced the previous procedure of having a separate initial preliminary hearing followed by a Plea and Case Management Hearing (PCMH) in an attempt to reduce the number of pre-trial hearings.

In triable either way offences, the defendant's right to elect a jury trial remains unfettered.

== Notes and references ==
- Clifford E M Chatterton and Philip K Brown. Committals for Trial to the Crown Court: The Law and Practice. Fourmat Publishing. London. 1988.
- John Bowers. "Committal for trial". Practice Notes on Procedure in Courts. Chapter 8.3 at pages 81 to 84.
- Peter Hungerford-Welch. "Committal for sentence". Criminal Procedure and Sentencing. Eighth Edition. Routledge. 2014. Chapter 5.13 at pages 112 to 116.
- P J Hidden, "The Benefits of Committal Proceedings" (1990 to 1991) 2 Current Issues in Criminal Justice 19
- John B Bishop, "The Abolition of Committal Proceedings" (1990 to 1991) 2 Current Issues in Criminal Justice 37
- J A R Dowd, "Committal Reform: Radical or Evolutionary Change?" (1990 to 1991) 2 Current Issues in Criminal Justice 10
- John Koumarelas, "Committals: an optional extra?" (1989) 14 Legal Service Bulletin 279
- Bronwyn Naylor, "Justiciability of Decisions in the Criminal Process: Review of Committal Proceedings in the Federal Court" (1990) 19 Federal Law Review 352
- "Committal Proceedings Misconception" (1979) 43 Journal of Criminal Law 163
- "The Floodgates of Judicial Review: Once More unto the Breach" (1993) 44 Northern Ireland Legal Quarterly 233 (Autumn 1993)
- R E Salhany, "Review of Committal for Trial" (1965 to 1966) 8 Criminal Law Quarterly 31
- Peter J Connelly, "Certiorari and Committals for Trial" (1980 to 1981) 23 Criminal Law Quarterly 369
- "Committal for Trial or Sentence?" (1984) 148 Justice of the Peace 497 (11 August 1984)
- Bruce M Haines, "Committals and Certiorari" (1965 to 1966) 8 Criminal Law Quarterly 141
- "Powers of Criminal Courts (Sentencing) Act 2000: Committal for Sentencing" (2012) 76 Journal of Criminal Law 12
- "Committals for Sentence under Ss. 41 and 56 of the Criminal Justice Act, 1967" (1970) 34 Journal of Criminal Law 200
- "From Committal Proceedings to Transfer for Trial" (1995) 159 Justice of the Peace & Local Government Law 379 (10 June 1995)
- Marjorie Jones, "Publicity for Committal Proceedings" in "As I see it" (1980) 144 Justice of the Peace 269 (3 May 1980)
- "Publicity for Committal Proceedings" in "Notes of the Year" (1949) 9 The Howard Journal 7
- "Effect of Lapse of Time on Committal Proceedings" (1991) 55 The Journal of Criminal Law 295
- "Committal Proceedings - Adversarial or Inquisitorial?" (1995) 59 The Journal of Criminal Law 111
- "Committal for Trial by Quarter Sessions" in "General Intelligence" (1936) 181 The Law Times 473 (13 June 1936)

== See also ==
- Civil confinement
- Warrant of committal
