= Pro tempore =

Latin phrase meaning "for the time being"

Pro tempore (/ˌproʊ ˈtɛmpəri, -ˌreɪ/), abbreviated pro tem or p.t., is a Latin phrase which best translates to 'for the time being' in English. This phrase is often used to describe a person who acts as a locum tenens 'placeholder'. The phrase is also used to describe officers appointed on a temporary basis, prior to the formalisation of their appointments.

== Mayor pro tem ==
A common use of pro tempore in the United States is in municipalities such as cities and towns with regard to the position of the mayor. In many cities, the city council appoints one of its members (often its president) to act as mayor pro tempore (pro tem) (or vice mayor) in the absence of the actual mayor.

== Judge pro tem ==
In judicial courts, attorneys that volunteer in proceedings are called "judge pro tem" or judge pro tempore, though they may be paid in some circumstances. They typically have to meet some basic criteria to qualify, and often serve as neutrals or mediators in alternative dispute resolution processes. Among other things, they can also serve as masters and interim judges.

== Academic leaders: president, vice-president, dean pro tem ==
Universities sometimes appoint senior positions such as presidents, vice presidents or heads of faculties temporarily until ratified by a board of governors or senate committee. These positions are titled "President pro tempore", "Vice-President pro tempore" or "Dean pro tempore".

== Congress ==
=== United States ===
The President pro tempore of the United States Senate presides over the senate when the Vice President of the United States is unable to. These two roles were established in Article One, Section Three of the United States Constitution. The first to hold this position was John Langdon for four months in 1788; he also served in the same position for 13 months in 1792-93.

The Speaker pro tempore of the United States House of Representatives was a position created after 2001, and the first to hold the position was Patrick McHenry in October 2023.

== Pro-cathedral ==
A pro-cathedral is a church that temporarily serves as a cathedral — the 'pro' is an abbreviation of pro tempore. Perhaps the most notable example is St Mary's Cathedral, Dublin, Ireland, which had been a pro-cathedral from the Reformation until 2025.

== See also ==
- Ex tempore
