= Avizandum =

Avizandum (from Late Lat. avizare, "to consider"), a Scots law term; the judge "makes avizandum with a cause," i.e. takes time to consider their judgment. Compare to curia advisari vult, the term used in the English tradition.
