= High Court enforcement officer =

Officer of the High Court of England and Wales

High Court Enforcement Officer (HCEO)
Occupation
- Names: Sheriff's officers
- Occupation type: Employment
- Activity sectors: Law enforcement, Law, Courts, High Court

Description
- Related jobs: Police officer, Constable, Court officer

A High Court enforcement officer (HCEO) is an officer of the High Court of England and Wales responsible for enforcing judgements of the High Court, often by seizing goods or repossessing property. Prior to 2004, HCEOs were known as sheriff's officers and were responsible for enforcing High Court writs on behalf of the high sheriff for each county, but they are now directly responsible for such writs. HCEOs operate only in England and Wales.

== Role and history ==
High Court enforcement officers are authorised by the Lord Chancellor, and assigned to one of a number of enforcement districts. Historically they would be assigned to the shrieval county (roughly the historic shire) of the corresponding high sheriff, but under the Courts Act 2003, this connection is severed and the districts are not necessarily conterminous with the shrievalty. The officers retain the common law powers of a sheriff, and, like the sheriff previously, can delegate this authority to others acting in their presence and on their behalf; every constable is obliged, upon their request, to assist them in executing a writ.

== Power of the High Court ==
Unlike a County Court bailiff, who is an officer of a lower court, an HCEO is an officer of the High Court, and consequently has much greater power.

No notice is required to the party on which the writ is executed; commercial premises can be broken into by the officer by any means they choose; and once present in a property they cannot be forcibly removed.

Obstructing an HCEO in the execution of a writ is considered to amount to a contempt of court, as was historically the case with sheriff's officers.

== Writs ==
The most common writ is the writ of control, known until 2014 as a writ of fieri facias. This writ is essentially for debt collection, but it actually takes the form of an order to the officers to seize goods from the judgment debtor worth a particular amount of money; the HCEO will attend the debtor's premises, seize the goods, and then sell them at auction.

Once the writ is awarded, the judgment debtor can avoid the removal and sale of assets by either paying in full or agreeing to a repayment plan. If they take this action, the assets will still technically remain seized and belong to the court until the debt is fully cleared, but are normally left in situ under a walking-possession agreement. Any proposed repayment schedule will have to be agreed by the claimant. Should the judgment debtor subsequently default on a payment, the claimant can instruct the HCEO to attend to remove and sell the seized assets; if the debtor disposes of the assets, they are committing contempt of court.

The debt does not need to be argued in the High Court; provided the amount owed is at least £600, the debt did not arise in a matter covered by the Consumer Credit Act 1974, and payment has not been made within the specified time, a County Court judgment can be transferred to the High Court for enforcement. The High Court fee for issuing a writ of control is £71; together with the HCEO's fees, this £71 court fee is added by the writ to the amount to be recovered from the debtor.
