= Warrant of committal =

A warrant of committal is a legal term used by the law systems of Canada and the United Kingdom, which allows a magistrate or judge to enforce a judgment or order against a person or corporation that has refused or neglected to comply with a known court ruling or order within a known fixed period of time.

== Eligibility and enforcement ==
The person (or director of a corporation) subject to the warrant of committal must have been served in a timely fashion with a copy of the order to do (or abstain from doing) the act in question. If the person served with the order fails to obey it, the judgment creditor may issue either a claim form or application notice seeking committal (for contempt of court) for the offender. The claim form or application notice must identify the breach of injunction which has taken place, and be supported by an affidavit (served with it) stating the grounds for the committal application.

A warrant of committal may not be enforced more than two years after the date it was issued, without further order from the court. The court may dispense with service of the judgment, order, claim form or application notice if it deems it fair to do so. If the committal order has been made in the absence of the respondent, without being served on him, the judge may fix a date and time when the person to be committed is to be brought before him or the court.

== Procedure ==
1. Clerk prepares the document (Warrant of Committal)
2. Clerk separates and distributes document

== Trend in Canada ==
Federal Warrant of Committal admissions in Canada have increased about 25% between 1989/90 and 1993/94, with approximately 1,000 offenders per year.
