= Judgment summons =

Judgment summons, in English law, a summons issued under the Debtors' Act 1869 (32 & 33 Vict. c. 62) on the application of a creditor who has obtained a judgment for the payment of a sum of money by instalments or otherwise, where the order for payment has not been complied with. The judgment summons cites the defendant to appear personally in court, and be examined on oath as to the means he has, or has had, since the date of the order or judgment made against him, to pay the same, and to show cause why he should not be committed to prison for his default. An order of commitment obtained in a judgment summons remains in force for a year only, and the extreme term of imprisonment is six weeks, dating from the time of lodging in prison.

When a debtor has once been imprisoned, although for a period of less than six weeks, no second order of commitment can be made against him in respect of the same debt. But if the judgment be for payment by instalments a power of committal arises on default of payment for each instalment.

However, if an order of commitment has never been executed, or becomes inoperative through lapse of time, a fresh commitment may be made.

Imprisonment does not operate as a satisfaction or extinguishment of a debt, or deprive a person of a right of execution against the land or goods of the person imprisoned in the same manner as there had been no imprisonment. In this regard the judgement summons procedure may be seen as a more extreme—because of the threat of imprisonment—version of the procedure under the Civil Procedure Rules procedure to obtain information from judgment debtors.

A judgment summons may now be served by post in keeping with other Civil Procedure Rules actions but, if this option is chosen, then a commitment order cannot be obtained unless: (a) he appears at the hearing; or (b) it is made under section 110(2) of the County Courts Act 1984.

Applications for these are now made under County Court Rules Order 28. There is a standard Civil Procedure Rules practice form which may be used to apply for the issue of the summons. As of 2024, the current fee for issue is £131.
