= Unreported employment =

Illegal employment that is not reported to the government

Unreported employment, also known as unlawful employment, illegal employment, working under the table or off the books is employment that is illegal and not reported to the government. The employer or the employee often does so for tax evasion or avoiding and violating other laws such as obtaining unemployment benefits while being employed. The working contract is made without social security costs and does typically not provide health insurance, paid parental leave, paid vacation or pension funds. It is a part of what has been called the underground economy, shadow economy, black market or the non-observed economy.

Payments are generally in cash, and the employer often does not check the employee's background or credentials, as is sometimes required by law or otherwise expected by the industry's client base, such as a license or professional certification.

While the hiring of the employee may or may not be legal in itself, it is often done when the employer or the employee intentionally fails to obey one or more laws.

In developed nations, unreported employment evades withholding tax and is part of the informal sector. It is hidden from the state for tax, social security, or labor law purposes.

== Enforcement ==
Often, both the employer and employee agree on paying in cash. Frequently, the employer is running an unreported cash-based business. These methods make detection by authorities to be time-consuming and difficult. Most small-scale operations take place without any real enforcement effort. Landscaping is a good example of a cash-based business that is frequently unreported.

In the United States, authorities have focused enforcement resources on large-scale operations like undocumented immigrants who are employed by large companies. Discovery and enforcement of small-scaled unreported employment is typically through a secondary indiscretion like fraud, tax irregularities, and unrelated or partially-related civil/criminal violations of the employer or employee.

Although the federal and/or state government may arrest, prosecute, and imprison an individual for engaging in commerce without the state's approval, the high cost of such enforcement is usually prohibitive and impossible except for the most egregious cases.

== Disadvantages ==
Unreported employment can have harmful effects on government, employers, and employees.

Unreported employment directly affects the government's ability to fund resources (government spending). It causes a tax gap by the reducing tax revenue of a government.

A 2005 University of California, Los Angeles, study showed that the economy in California was weakened by more than two million workers being paid without paying taxes. Indeed, it is estimated that over US$214.6 billion went unreported to the IRS last year alone from this.

Those who are employed under the table, including undocumented immigrants, may be denied rights that legally employed workers have, such as minimum wage, various benefits (particularly unemployment benefits), and fair treatment.

Under-the-table employees who lose their jobs may not be entitled to collect unemployment benefits. They have limited causes of action against their employers for mistreatment, on-the-job work accidents, or lack of payment. Employers have limited cause of actions against employees who commit crimes such as embezzlement, theft, or abuse of employer.

If practices are widespread, legitimate businesses may be undercut by and may have difficulty competing with those who employ staff illegally.

Government revenue agencies look for lifestyles out of line with the income reported. They have tools that aid in assessing unreported taxes, which can result in large fines or jail time for the employer.

== Benefits ==
The complexity of employment regulations and large amount of paperwork can be daunting, especially when someone is needed for only a few hours a week. In some countries, the tax system attempts to set minimum thresholds on the amounts liable. However, there is still the burden of compliance with the bookkeeping requirements to prove that one is exempt. Although nanny laws make allowances for the homeowner, businesses are typically required to fill out and file several hours' worth of paperwork even for an hour's worth of work. The amounts are too small for tax collecting agencies to pursue and the paperwork too arduous to file and so legitimate micro-employment among businesses is rare. However, it is an important resource for many small businesses.

Youth-run lemonade stands that have been shut down by police for example have received an enormous amount of bad press and public outcry. Government revenue collectors typically ignore enforcement of such beneficial, unreported employment.

Reasons one may work or pay a worker cash-in-hand include:

- Avoidance of wage garnishment or payment of child support or alimony
- Cheaper workforce and avoidance of minimum wage laws
- Convenience for both parties
- Elimination of paperwork, bookkeeping, and regulation compliance
- Reduced/eliminated expenses or need for bookkeepers, human resource specialists, lawyers, accountants, payroll services, insurance agents and other employment specialists
- Not checking or showing a criminal record
- Protesting actions or policies of the governing authorities e.g. sovereign citizen movement (see agorism)
- Evasion of insurance requirements
- Flexibility in hiring short-term employees without excessive overhead or paperwork
- Avoid allowable income limits by a person receiving certain benefits, such as unemployment, disability, or public assistance
- Fugitive, draft evasion, illegal immigration, prison escape, or organized crime
- Tax noncompliance, tax resistance, or social security evasion
- Ability to hire employees according to personal traits not related to suitability for employment (e.g. gender, sexuality, ethnic/religious affiliations etc.)
- Ability to hire those who were formerly qualified, and still potentially able to do the job (e.g. blacklisted, disbarred, forced retirement, struck off, etc.)
- Ability to hire underage, teenage employees without going through child labor laws or hire those below the minimum working age (e.g. for short-term projects)
- Quicker, faster hiring process from application to job attainment

== Common jobs ==
Common types of employment sectors of unreported jobs include the following:

- Domestic work such as housekeeping, babysitting, or foodservice
- Construction work, landscaping, farm work
- Taxicab service (sometimes as illegal taxi operations)
- Gig economy such as food delivery
- Various types of self-employment, such as plumbing, electrician, window cleaning, painting and decorating, street market trading, agriculture and gardening
- Short-term work and day laborers
- Short-term youth employment
- Barbacking and restaurant work
- Human trafficking
- Prostitution
- Fixing cars, motorcycles, and mopeds
- Second jobs apart from primary jobs

== Examples ==
=== United States ===
According to a New York Times report in February 2013, the Obama administration had demonstrated a new strategy to curb the employment of undocumented immigrants by focusing on companies that hire them in the first place. By concentrating on the businesses employing the large numbers of unauthorized workers, the number of undocumented immigrants working in the US would drop dramatically. The US government would be doing so in a less confrontational manner than in recent years.

In 2009, a U.S. Immigration and Customs Enforcement audit of American Apparel's employment records uncovered discrepancies in the documentation of about 25% of the company's workers, implying mainly that they were undocumented immigrants. American Apparel fired about 1,500 employees that September as a result. ICE did not accuse American Apparel of knowingly employing workers without employment authorization, however, and American Apparel received no fines.

== See also ==
- Side job
- Informal economy
- Black market
- Illegal immigration
- U.S. Immigration and Customs Enforcement (ICE)
