= Taking control of goods =

UK remedy of claiming a debtor's goods

Taking control of goods, formerly called walking possession, refers to the legal practice in the United Kingdom under which a bailiff takes possession of the goods of a defaulting debtor, but does not remove the goods.

After a bailiff has gained peaceful entry to the premises of a debtor, the bailiff may seize any of the debtor's goods that are found on the premises (except for certain categories of goods, such as tools of the debtor's trade). After gaining entry once, the bailiff may re-enter the premises at any time, and remove the goods at any time. The bailiff may choose not to remove the goods immediately, giving the debtor an opportunity to pay the debt (plus the bailiff's costs). In the meantime, the bailiff takes control of the goods. The bailiff may ask the debtor to sign a Controlled Goods Agreement, listing the goods that have been seized and acknowledging that the debtor no longer has legal title to the goods.
