= County Court bailiff =

County Court bailiffs are employees of His Majesty's Courts and Tribunals Service and are responsible for enforcing orders of the County Court by recovering money owed under County Court judgments. Bailiffs can seize and sell goods to recover the amount of the debt. They can also serve court documents and effect and supervise the possession of property and the return of goods under hire purchase agreements.

== Entry ==
A County Court bailiff can enter a premises to seize goods and sell these at public auction, they can enter a property through an unlocked door (front and back). If the bailiff has attempted entry previously (made a levy) or has been forcefully removed they can then use reasonable force to gain re-entry to inspect the goods or remove them.

When determining the value of goods to be seized, it is the likely price that the goods will reach at auction that is pertinent, not what was paid for them.

== Police assistance ==
Section 85(4) of the County Courts Act 1984 states: It shall be the duty of every constable within his jurisdiction to assist in the execution of every such warrant. This is rarely used and if the police are called they will generally be there to prevent a breach of the peace.

There has been debate about the lack of training that police are given with respect to the powers of bailiffs whilst executing a warrant.

== Penalty for assaulting County Court bailiffs ==
Section 14 of the County Court Act 1984 gives the following penalty: If any person assaults an officer of a court while in the execution of his duty, he shall be liable—

(a) on summary conviction, to imprisonment for a term not exceeding 3 months or to a fine of an amount not exceeding level 5 on the standard scale, or both; or
(b) on an order made by the judge in that behalf, to be committed for a specified period not exceeding 3 months to prison or to such a fine as aforesaid, or to be so committed and to such a fine, and a Bailiff of the court may take the offender into custody, with or without warrant, and bring him before the judge.

== Debtor's vehicle ==
A debtor's vehicle can be immobilised or removed and goods can be taken up to the value of outstanding judgment plus additional bailiff/removal/auction house fees. Vehicles may be immobilised/removed on both private or public land but if on private land the bailiff has to have the land owners permission to enter if the land doesn't belong to the person named on the warrant. However a vehicle used in the course of a debtors business may not be clamped or taken.

== Arrest warrant ==
County Court bailiffs execute arrest warrants to secure attendance to court or committal proceedings (contempt of court, etc.).

== See also ==
- High Court enforcement officer
