= Bailiff =

Manager, overseer or custodian

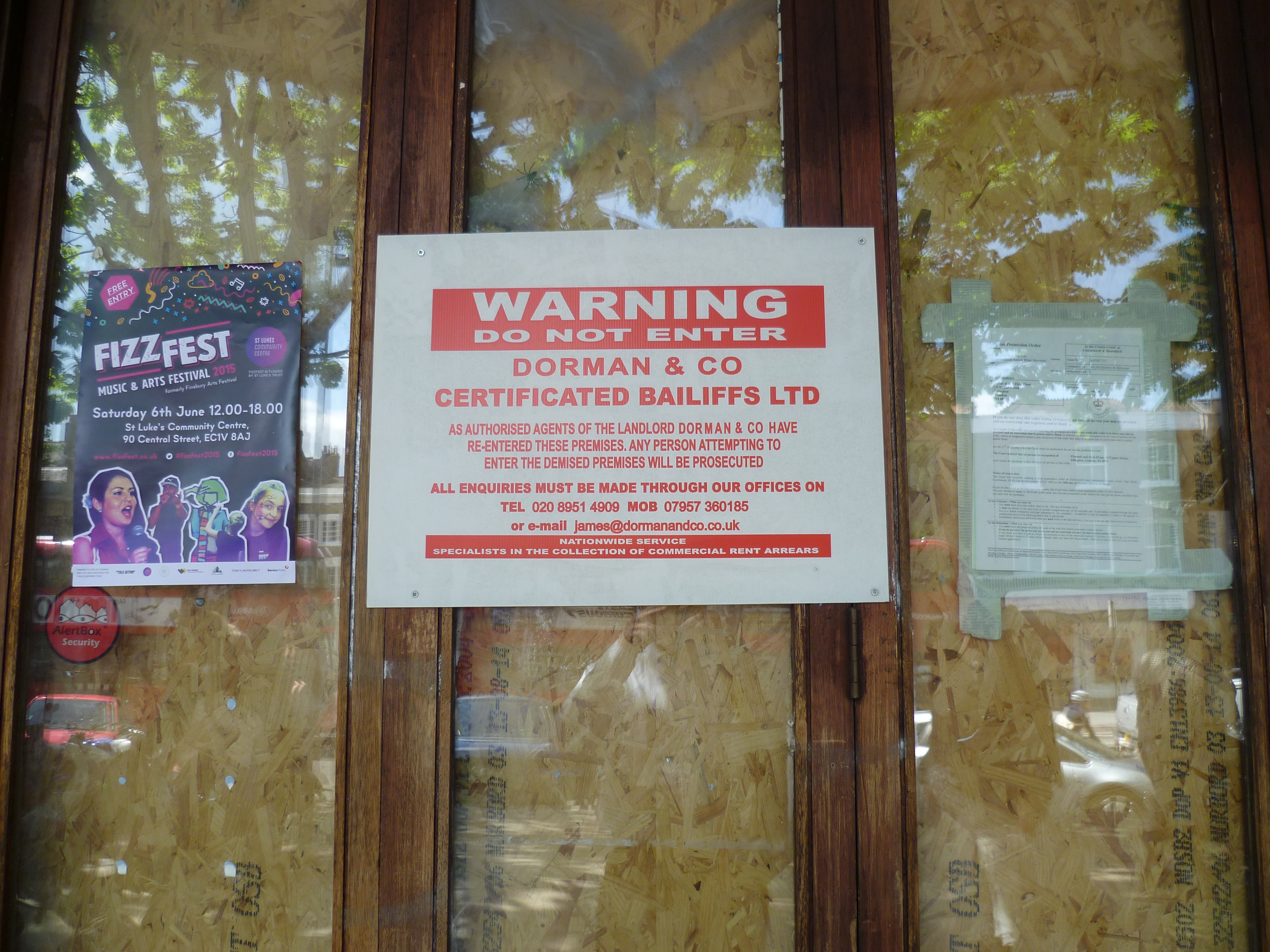
Bailiff's notice on boarded-up premises, London, 2015

A bailiff (Note: /ˈbeɪlɪf/ BAY-lif; from Middle English baillif, Old French baillis, bail "custody".) is a manager, overseer or custodian – a legal officer to whom some degree of authority or jurisdiction is given. There are different kinds, and their offices and scope of duties vary.

Another official sometimes referred to as a bailiff was the Vogt. In the Holy Roman Empire a similar function was performed by the Amtmann. They are mostly known for being the officer that keeps the order in a court of law and who also administers oaths to people who participate in court proceedings.

== Britain and Ireland ==
=== Historic bailiffs ===
Bailiff was the term used by the Normans for what the Saxons had called a reeve: the officer responsible for executing the decisions of a court. The duty of the bailiff would thus include serving summonses and orders, and executing all warrants issued out of the corresponding court. The district within which the bailiff operated was called his bailiwick, and is even to the present day. Bailiffs were outsiders and free men, that is, they were not usually from the bailiwick for which they were responsible.

Throughout Norman England, the Saxon and Norman populations gradually mixed, and reeve came to be limited to shire-level courts (hence sheriff as a contraction of "shire-reeve"), while bailiff was used in relation to the lower courts. Primarily then, bailiff referred to the officer executing the decisions of manorial courts, and the hundred courts. Likewise, in Scotland a bailie was the chief officer of a barony (baron bailie), and in the Channel Islands they were the principal civil officers. With the introduction of justices of the peace (magistrates), magistrates' courts acquired their own bailiffs.

Historically, courts were not only concerned with legal matters, and often decided administrative matters for the area within their jurisdiction. A bailiff of a manor, therefore, would often oversee the manor's lands and buildings, collect its rents, manage its accounts, and run its farms (see Walter of Henley).

In the 19th century, the administrative functions of courts were mostly replaced by the creation of elected local authorities (councils). Nevertheless, the term bailiff is retained as a title by the chief officers of various towns and the keepers of royal castles, such as the High Bailiff of Westminster and the Bailiff of Dover Castle. In Scotland, bailie now refers to a municipal officer corresponding to an English alderman.

In the 20th century, the court system in England was drastically re-organised, with the assize courts taking some of the powers of the shire courts, and becoming the High Court of Justice; in turn, the remaining elements of the shire court took over the powers of the hundred courts, to form county courts. The High Court acquired the sheriffs, the county courts the bailiffs. Bailiffs were now appointed by a county court judge and were removable by the Lord Chancellor.

==== Delegation ====
A bailiff could, for practical reasons, delegate his responsibilities, in regard to some particular court instruction, to other individuals. As the population expanded, the need for the services of a bailiff mainly arose from financial disputes; consequently, these assistants came to be closely associated with debt-collection, in the public's minds. By Shakespeare's time, they had acquired the nickname bum-bailiffs, perhaps because they followed debtors very closely behind them; in France, the term pousse-cul (literally push-arse) was similarly used for their equivalent officers.

To avoid confusion with their underlings, the County Courts Act 1888 (51 & 52 Vict. c. 43) renamed bailiffs as high bailiffs. This act also formally acknowledged right of the high bailiffs to appoint (and dismiss) under-bailiffs as they wished, and establishing that the high bailiffs retain ultimate responsibility for their actions. High bailiff gradually became a purely ceremonial role, the court's clerk liaising with under-bailiffs directly.

The Law of Distress Amendment Act 1888 (51 & 52 Vict. c. 21) enacts that no person may act as an under-bailiff to levy any distress for rent unless he is authorized by a county court judge to act as an under-bailiff. The County Courts Act 1888 restricted the hours an under-bailiff could execute a possession warrant, to only be between 6 a.m. and 10 p.m. (§ 142). It also limited the ability to bring a legal complaint against a bailiff; six days' notice now had to be given (§52).

=== Modern-day usage ===
==== Channel Islands ====
In the Channel Islands the bailiff is the first civil officer in each of the two bailiwicks. He is appointed by the Crown, and holds office until retirement. He presides as a judge in the Royal Court, and takes the opinions of the jurats; he also presides over the States Assembly (Jersey) or States of Guernsey, and represents the Crown on civic occasions. The bailiff in each island must, in order to fulfill his judicial role, be a qualified lawyer.

==== England and Wales ====
In England and Wales, there are a number of offices either formally titled, or commonly referred to, as "bailiffs". Some of these bailiffs are concerned with executing the orders of the courts, generally around the collection of debts, and some exercise semi-official supervisory powers over certain activities. Those concerned with the execution of court orders are commonly referred to as bailiffs, although reforms to the law in 2014 have renamed all these positions to alternative titles.

With the 19th-century renaming of bailiffs to "high bailiffs", their under-bailiffs generally came to be referred to as bailiffs themselves. The powers and responsibilities of these bailiffs depend on which type of court they take orders from. In emulation of these responsibilities, a number of roles established by 19th century statute laws have also been named "bailiffs", despite not having a connection to a court.

It has been estimated by Citizens Advice those bailiffs had added £250 million in fees to people's debts in the 18 months up to March 2023. The organisation surveyed 6,274 adults in England and Wales across a month-long period from February to March 2023 who had an interaction or interactions with bailiffs. According to Citizens Advice over 33% who had an interaction with a bailiff suffered behaviour that broke the rules of the Ministry of Justice. These behaviours included bailiffs breaking and entering into homes and bailiffs not considering illnesses or disabilities. Almost 60% of those who interacted with a bailiff reported harassment or intimidation, misrepresentation of powers and threats to break into homes. 72% of respondents reported that interactions with bailiffs had impacted their mental health and 49% reported long-term financial consequences.

===== Magistrates' bailiffs =====
Civilian enforcement officers are employees of His Majesty's Courts and Tribunals Service, and can seize and sell goods to recover money owed under a fine and community penalty notice, and also execute warrants of arrest, committal, detention and control (formally called distress or distraint). These functions can also be carried out by employees of private companies authorised by the Ministry of Justice. In July 2013 HM Court Service announced it is to fully contract out the whole of the compliance and enforcement process to a private company; this would involve the transfer of over 500 of its employees. This decision led to official strike action by some employees on 30 July 2013.

===== Certificated enforcement agents =====
Certificated enforcement agents are used by local authorities, His Majesty's Courts and Tribunals Service and landlords for a variety of reasons such as collection of taxes, road traffic debts and commercial rent arrears.

===== County Court bailiffs =====
County Court bailiffs remain directly employed by HM Courts Service, carrying out enforcement for the County Court. The current frequency of different types of case means that they are mainly involved in recovering payment of unpaid County Court judgments; like magistrates' bailiffs, they can seize and sell goods to recover a debt. They can also effect and supervise the possession of the property and the return of goods under hire purchase agreements, and serve court documents. They also execute arrest warrants and search warrants.

===== High Court enforcement officers =====
A High Court enforcement officer has similar functions to a County Court bailiff, in that they execute writs and warrants for unpaid court judgements, and evict people from land where possession has been granted. The majority of the work of High Court enforcement officers is carried out by certificated enforcement agents acting under the authority of a senior High Court enforcement officer, often a director of an enforcement firm for whom the enforcement agent works.

Another officer of the High Court, the tipstaff, is an employee of HM Courts and Tribunals Service, and is concerned with enforcing certain judgments of the High Court, typically involving the enforcement of court orders relating to the custody of children in family law cases.

===== Water bailiff =====
Water bailiffs also exist in England and Wales to police bodies of water and prevent illegal fishing. They are generally employees of the Environment Agency and when executing their duties, have the powers and privileges of a police constable for the purpose of the enforcement of the Salmon and Freshwater Fisheries Act 1975.

===== Farm bailiff =====
Farm bailiffs exist on landed estates. The farm bailiff is employed by the proprietor and his managerial duties can include collecting rent, taxes and supervising both farm operations and labourers. Historically, the estate would typically include a hall or manor house, a home farm managed by the bailiff, several smaller farms occupied by tenants and possibly a tiny village (a collection of small cottages) in which the farm labourers lived.

===== Epping Forest bailiffs =====
The Epping Forest Act 1878 allows the conservators of the forest to appoint forest keepers, reeves and also bailiffs. These individuals may also be attested as a constable, although currently only forest keepers are sworn in. The forest currently has volunteer fishing bailiffs, who support forest keepers. As the Epping Forest Act does include this title of appointment, these individuals are statutory bailiffs and the title is not merely just historic.

===== Jury bailiffs =====
Jury bailiffs are court ushers who monitor juries during their deliberations and during overnight stays.

===== Colloquial uses of the word =====
As most people's contact with bailiffs is when a bailiff comes to take property to enforce debt, public perception does not usually distinguish between bailiffs and debt collectors. Indeed, many debt collectors often publicly refer to themselves as bailiffs. However, it is illegal for a debt collector to call themselves a bailiff, if they are not – that is, if they are not a certified officer acting on a court order, they may not call themselves a bailiff. Debt collectors do not have the powers or authority of a bailiff.

The officer appointed by a sheriff was also sometimes described as the sheriff's bailiff, on account of the similarity of the role. However, they are not the same, and High Court enforcement officers have greater powers.

Due to the negative association with debt collection, in former times, in the Fens of eastern England, the term Bailiff of Bedford was often used as slang for destructive floods of the River Great Ouse.

==== Isle of Man ====
The High Bailiff is the head stipendiary magistrate in the Isle of Man.

==== Scotland ====
The Scottish form of this post is the bailie. Bailies served as burgh magistrates in the system of local government in Scotland before 1975 when the system of burghs and counties was replaced by a two-tier system of regional councils and district councils. The two-tier system was later replaced by a system of unitary authorities.

Under the new arrangements the bailies were abolished and replaced by justices of the peace serving in the District Courts of Scotland, these posts no longer holding any authority within the local authority as an administrative body. However, the term bailie is still used as an honorary title by Glasgow City Council for a number of senior councilors who can deputise for the Lord Provost.

The Scottish equivalent of a sheriff's bailiff or high bailiff is the sheriff officer (for the sheriff court) or the messenger-at-arms (for the court of session). These positions were to be abolished by §60 of the Bankruptcy and Diligence etc. (Scotland) Act 2007, and replaced with the office of judicial officer under §57(1) of that enactment. This enactment was never brought into effect and was repealed under schedule 4 of the Public Services Reform (Scotland) Act 2010

In Scotland, the office of water bailiff does exist, with power to enforce legislation relating to the illegal collection of salmon and trout.

==== Republic of Ireland ====
In the Republic of Ireland, a bailiff (Irish: báille) is an official appointed by the Revenue Commissioners who is involved with the enforcement of judgments, including evictions and repossessions, and the collection of unpaid tax. A bailiff is subordinate to a sheriff.

== Australia ==
In Australia, a bailiff is an officer of a court exercising civil law jurisdiction who is charged with the duty and responsibility of executing the orders of the civil jurisdiction of the court. Those orders are contained in warrants or orders including typically to seize and sell personal & real property, to evict tenants, to arrest and bring persons to that court who have failed to appear when summoned and to arrest and convey to prison persons who disobey orders of that court.

The officers exercising criminal law jurisdiction are the police and policing agencies.

The officer of the Supreme Court of the State or Territory who fulfils these duties is the Sheriff of the State or Territory often simply referred to as "the Supreme Court Sheriff of <the State or Territory>". The Sheriff's roles and responsibilities are however generally very much broader than those of a bailiff and not dealt with here. While traditionally the Sheriff and the bailiffs of the separate courts were each independent officers of the crown the trend in legal administration is to appoint a civil servant within the department of the respective Attorney General as Sheriff and they then engage, appoint or contract deputy sheriffs, sheriffs officers and bailiffs of the lower courts.

The bailiff operates within a defined geographical area (or areas), generally those of the jurisdiction of the court, and accordingly known as their bailiwick.

Traditionally bailiffs were required to serve, or attempt to serve, the other legal processes issued by their court however this is generally not an exclusive obligation on the bailiff and the serving of other court processes may be carried out by the litigants, their legal representatives or by persons carrying on business as process servers.

Bailiffs are not debt collectors though some may hold debt collecting licences and in a number of jurisdictions government has contracted as bailiffs, persons or corporations who previously or concurrently conduct business as debt collectors and or process servers.

Bailiffs were generally required to attend upon the sitting of their court to act as court orderlies, or ushers. The current trend favours use of specialist security businesses providing all aspects of security in courts. Nonetheless, the court orderlies (or ushers) so engaged may still occasionally be referred to as bailiffs.

There are legislated constraints upon persons or corporations calling themselves bailiffs, sheriffs or police and upon using those terms in business or corporation names.

The laws and practices pertaining to bailiffs and sheriffs are directly inherited from and modelled upon British law and legal precedents but subsequently modified by legislation enacted and precedents formed in each state or territorial jurisdiction.

== Canada ==
In parts of Canada, bailiffs are responsible for the service of legal process. In some jurisdictions, duties of the bailiff include the service of legal documents, repossession and evictions in accordance with court judgments, application of wheel clamps and the execution of arrest warrants. Some jurisdictions also require that applicants receive special training and have a degree in paralegal technology to become a bailiff.

=== Ontario ===
Ontario provincial bailiff shoulder flash

In Ontario, provincial bailiffs provide primary transportation of prisoners between correctional facilities such as jails and prisons. Under the Ministry of Correctional Services Act, while transporting prisoners, bailiffs have the powers of police constables. When necessary, Provincial correctional officers will act as bailiffs for short and long term assignments and full-time bailiffs are typically recruited from the correctional officer ranks. Provincial bailiffs are armed with expandable batons and pepper spray and operate under the jurisdiction of the provincial Ministry of the Solicitor General. Duties normally associated with bailiffs in other jurisdictions, such as residential evictions, seizures, and other processes order by the court, are performed by sheriffs under the office of the Attorney General of Ontario or "private" bailiffs if initiated without a court order.

==== Private bailiffs ====
Private bailiffs are licensed by the Ministry of Public and Business Service Delivery under the Bailiffs Act. Assistant bailiffs are similarly licensed, but must be supervised by a full bailiff. Bailiffs in this capacity assist others who have a right to exercise self-help to repossess or seize something, or to evict under a commercial (non-residential) tenancy. Bailiffs are agents of the person contracting their services, not government employees or peace officers, and are prohibited from carrying weapons or using force to seize goods or evict tenants.

== United States ==
In the United States, the word bailiff colloquially means any officer who keeps order in the courtroom while a court of law is in session. A bailiff provides physical security, handles prisoners, guards the jury, performs a number of ancient traditional duties (such as ordering "All rise!" when the judge enters, escorting witnesses to the stand, etc.), and in some jurisdictions, they may assist the trial judge in administrative tasks like scheduling or communications between judges and parties to a suit. The officers who perform the role of "bailiff" vary by state. In some states, the role is filled by court officers who work for the judiciary. In other states, the role is filled by county sheriff's deputies who are assigned to the court, state troopers, marshals, corrections officers or constables. The terminology varies among (and sometimes within) states. The same officers who serve as bailiffs typically have other duties in and around the courthouse, such as providing general security, guarding prisoners in the courthouse lock-up, etc. However, in some states the role of bailiff is primarily ceremonial (more akin to a "sergeant at arms") and may be performed by the judge's law clerk (a junior lawyer in training under the judge's supervision). In those cases, physical security and prisoner handling would be handled by other officers.

Regardless of title, the agency providing court security is often the same agency charged with serving legal process and seizing and selling property (e.g., replevin or foreclosure). In some cases, the duties are separated between agencies in a given jurisdiction. For instance, a court officer may provide courtroom security in a jurisdiction where a sheriff or constable handles service of process and seizures.

Martha Symons Boies Atkinson became the first female bailiff in the United States in 1870 in Wyoming.

== France ==
In pre-revolutionary France, bailiff (French: bailli, French pronunciation: [baji]) was the king's administrative representative during the ancien régime in northern France, where the bailiff was responsible for the application of justice and control of the administration and local finances in his bailiwick (baillage).

Bailli (12th-century French bailif, "administrative official, deputy") was derived from a Vulgar Latin term *bajulivus meaning "official in charge of a castle", i.e. a royal castellan.

=== History ===
In the late 12th and early 13th century, King Philip II, an able and ingenious administrator who founded the central institutions on which the French monarchy's system of power would be based, prepared the expansion of the royal demesne through his appointment of bailiffs in the king's northern lands (the domaine royal), based on the medieval fiscal and tax division known as the "baillie" which had been used by earlier sovereign princes such as the Duke of Normandy. In Flanders, the count appointed similar bailiffs (Dutch: baljuw). The equivalent agent in the king's southern lands acquired after the inheritance of the County of Toulouse was the seneschal.

Unlike the local administration of Norman England through sheriffs drawn from the great local families, the French bailiff was a paid government official, who had no power network in the area to which he had been assigned, and, in the way of a true bureaucrat, owed his income and social status wholly to the central administration that he represented. "He was therefore fanatically loyal to the king," Norman Cantor observes, "and was concerned only with the full exercise of royal power." The cathedral schools and the University of Paris provided the clerks and lawyers who served as the king's bailiff.

=== Magistrates ===
Under the Ancien Régime in France, the bailli (earlier baillis), or bailie, was the king's chief officer in a bailiwick or bailiery (bailliage), serving as chief magistrate for boroughs and baronies, administrator, military organizer, and financial agent. In southern France the term generally used was sénéchal who held office in a sénéchaussée. The bailie convened a bailie court (cour baillivale) which was an itinerant court of first instance. The administrative network of bailiwicks was established in the 13th century over the Crown lands (the domaine royal) by Philip Augustus who commissioned the first bailiff under the name bailli. They were based on pre-existing tax collection districts (baillie) which had been in use in formerly sovereign territories, e.g., the Duchy of Normandy. Bailie courts, as royal courts, were made superior over existent local courts; these lower courts were called:

- provost courts (prévôtés royales), sat by a provost (prévôt) appointed and paid by the bailie;
- Norman vicomtés, sat by a viscount (vicomte) (position could be held by non-nobles);
- elsewhere in northern France, châtellenies, sat by a castellan (position could be held by non-nobles);
- or, in the south, vigueries or baylies, sat by a viguier or bayle.

The bailie court was presided over by a lieutenant-bailie (lieutenant général du bailli). Bailie courts had appellate jurisdiction over lower courts (manorial courts, provost courts) but was the court of first instance for suits involving the nobility. Appeal of bailie court judgments lay in turn with the provincial Parlements. In an effort to reduce the Parlements' caseload, several bailie courts were granted extended powers by Henry II of France and were thereafter called presidial courts (baillages présidiaux). Bailie and presidial courts were also the courts of first instance for certain crimes (previously the jurisdiction of manorial courts): sacrilege, treason, kidnapping, rape, heresy, money defacement, sedition, insurrection, and illegal bearing of weapons.

By the late 16th century, the bailie's role had become mostly symbolic, and the lieutenant-bailie was the only one to hear cases. The administrative and financial role of the bailie courts declined in the early modern period (superseded by the king's royal tax collectors and provincial governors, and later by intendants), and by the end of the 18th century, the bailiwicks, which numbered in the hundreds, had become purely judicial.

=== Ushers, beadles and tipstaffs ===
In medieval France court bailiffs did not exist as such, but their functions were carried out by several court officers. The ussier (modern huissier), or usher, originally the doorkeeper, kept order in the court. The somoneor (mod. semonneur), or court crier, adjourned and called the court to order and announced its orders or directions. The bedel (mod. bedeau), or beadle, was the court's messenger and served process, especially summonses (sumunse, somonse, mod. semonce). And finally the sergens (mod. sergent), or tipstaff, enforced judgments of the court, seized property, and made arrests. The tipstaff's badge of authority was his verge, or staff, made of ebony, about 30 cm long, decorated with copper or ivory, and mandatory after 1560.

The Parlement courts consolidated most of these functions in its tipstaff (varlet), and the rest of the court system followed suit as the tipstaff was given the broadest powers. During the Renaissance, the four officers were reduced to two—the huissier and sergent—who took on all these functions, with the distinction being that the huissier served in higher courts and sergent in bailie courts (sergent royal) and manorial courts (sergent de justice). In 1705 the two professions were fused by royal edict under the name huissier.

== Low Countries and German-speaking lands ==
The office of bailiff was historically used in Flanders, Zeeland, the Netherlands, Hainault, and in northern France. The bailiff was a civil servant who represented the ruler in town and country. In Flanders the count usually appointed the bailiff.

In the Low Countries and German-speaking Europe this position was known as baljuw (from bailli), but other words were used such as schout "reeve, (medieval) bailiff" (Holland, Antwerp, Mechelen, 's-Hertogenbosch, Turnhout), meier "majordomo" (Asse, Leuven), drossāte "steward, seneschal" (other parts of Brabant), amman (Brussels), and Amtmann and Ammann (Germany, Switzerland, Austria). The Amtmann was the senior official appointed by a territorial lord to oversee the administration and jurisdiction of a manorial estate or equivalent.

=== Belgium ===
Most of the functions associated with the older Dutch-language terms translated as 'bailiff' in English, are no longer found in one officer. The modern Belgian terms huissier de justice (in French) or gerechtsdeurwaarder (in Dutch), however, are often, and inaccurately, translated into English as 'bailiff', though the latter under an Anglo Saxon law system is by no means identical to the former who is typical for many countries influenced by the Napoleonic Code. The bailiff is a sworn officer who may legally deliver exploits (process serving), see to the execution of court orders such as the confiscation of goods, or make formal record of events, acts and circumstances. In Belgium, the bailiff can be appointed by a confiscating court to exercise the judicial mandate of schuldbemiddelaar (in Dutch) or médiateur de dettes (in French), a debt negotiator, in a procedure called collectieve schuldenregeling (CSR) or médiation collective de dettes, a collectively negotiated settlement of debts, which is comparable with the regulations by the Wet Schuldsanering Natuurlijke Personen (WSNP) in the Netherlands.

In auction catalogs published in Brussels at the beginning of the 20th century, the term huissier is associated with auction sales, i.e., vente aux enchères publiques par le ministère de Me Grégoire, huissier, 26, rue Josaphat, à Bruxelles. [Galerie Georges Giroux, November 27, 1937.]

=== Netherlands ===
In Netherlands during the Middle Ages, the term bailiff translates to baljuw, which had various meanings and sometimes carried the same privileges and duties as the title drost or drossaard, depending on the jurisdiction. Pieter Cornelisz Hooft for example, carried both the titles "Drost van Muiden" and "Baljuw van Goeilandt", that were more or less honorary titles by that time. The two neighboring areas had needed the office to oversee the appointment of local council staff (mostly referred to as "schout & schepenen"), whose most important interests were the passage of travelers and goods by water (Muiden) and overland (Gooiland). The Netherlands was governed by waterschappen as well as by regional city councils, and both institutions once had honorary titles of baljuw or drost.

These days, the term bailiff is not used in the Netherlands, except for the position of president and some honorary bailiffs of the Dutch branch of the Knights Hospitaller.

A person who amongst others sees to the execution of court orders such as the confiscation of goods is called a deurwaarder.

== Sovereign Military Order of Malta ==
In the Sovereign Military Order of Malta the term bailiff is used for an honour given to certain senior knights. The dignity of bailiff may be conferred upon:

- a Knight Grand Cross of Justice (i.e. a professed knight)
- a Knight Grand Cross of Honour and Devotion in Obedience
- a Knight Grand Cross of Honour and Devotion
- a Cardinal of the Holy Roman Church

The heads of several royal or princely houses who are Knights Grand Cross of Honour and Devotion usually receive the dignity of bailiff. These currently include King Albert II of Belgium; Franz, Duke of Bavaria; Louis Alphonse, Duke of Anjou; Hans-Adam II, Prince of Liechtenstein.

Non-Catholics who are heads or senior members of royal or princely houses may be granted the insignia of a Bailiff Knight Grand Cross of Honour and Devotion. These currently include King Simeon II of Bulgaria and Grand Duke George Mikhailovich of Russia. They are permitted to wear the collar, star, and sash of a bailiff, but, not being Catholic, do not receive any of the spiritual benefits of membership in the Order.

== Poland ==
In Poland, a court bailiff (Polish: komornik sądowy) is a public official (but not a civil servant) who is assigned to undertake enforcement action within the area of the jurisdiction of a single regional court (in Poland "a regional court is established for one or more communes, and, in justified cases, more than one regional court may be established for a single commune"*). With the 2008 amendment of the Court Bailiffs and Enforcement Act of 20 August 1997 a bailiff is allowed to act in the whole territory of the Republic of Poland if and only if the creditors remark in the enforcement application that they exercise a right of selecting a bailiff. Then the bailiff acts beyond its area of action, which might result in a prolonged and ineffective enforcement. However, such practices are inadmissible when the creditors apply for the enforcement to be carried out in respect of real property and other property rights where the regulations on the execution on real property shall apply. The execution proceedings on real property must be conducted only by the court bailiff who acts within the area of the jurisdiction of the regional court which keeps land and mortgage register for that real property.

A court bailiff is an individual who is appointed to act as such by the minister of justice on application of the person concerned, filed via the intermediary of the president of the court of appeal, within whose area the candidate intends to perform acts in enforcement proceedings. Before appointing, the minister of justice shall request the council of the chamber of the court bailiffs to give the opinion of the candidate. The bailiffs are not employed by the regional courts (they act at the regional courts) but they are self-employed, which means that they have their own registered offices (named Bailiff's Office in...) and are remunerated by percentage on money recovered and the other fees specified in The Court Bailiffs and Enforcement Act of 20 August 1997. The bailiff also incurs expenses including costs of correspondence, operating costs per kilometer when visiting debtors residing out of the place of bailiff's office; and the other expenses specified in above mentioned act. All those expenses incurred in the course of proceedings are to be covered by the debtor or by the creditor if the enforcement proceedings are ineffective. The regional courts supervise only the work of the bailiffs, especially with reference to the fastness, proficiency and accuracy of their activities; the correctness of office management and accounting. When enforcing the bailiffs are subordinate to the judicial decisions and president of the regional court. The bailiff acts on behalf of a creditor who is legally owed money. The creditor files an application for commencing enforcement proceedings and an original writ of execution with an enforcement clause inserted herein.

The court bailiffs are responsible for:

- enforcing judicial decisions concerning pecuniary and non-pecuniary claims,
- securing the aforesaid claims,
- enforcing other writs of execution issued pursuant to separate provisions and writs of execution requiring to be enforced pursuant to separate provisions by way of court enforcement without providing them with the enforcement clause,
- drawing up the report regarding the actual state of affairs before commencing legal proceedings and issuing decisions—if ordered by the court or prosecutor,
- serving court notices, announcements, objections, complaints and other documents against a receipt and date-annotation,
- exercising official supervision of the voluntary public auctions with adjudication to the lowest and highest bidder—upon a motion from the auction organizer.

(Sources: *www.ms.gov.pl/en/the-judiciary-in-poland/ Ustawa o komornikach sądowych i egzekucji z dnia 29.08.1997; Kodeks postępowania Cywilnego)

== Scandinavia ==
The Swedish Enforcement Authority, Kronofogdemyndigheten, literally: The Crown Bailiff Authority is a government agency in charge of debt collection, distraint and evictions in Sweden.

== See also ==
- Bailiff (order)
- Catchpole
- Marshal
- Vidame
