= Distraint =

Seizure of property to obtain payments

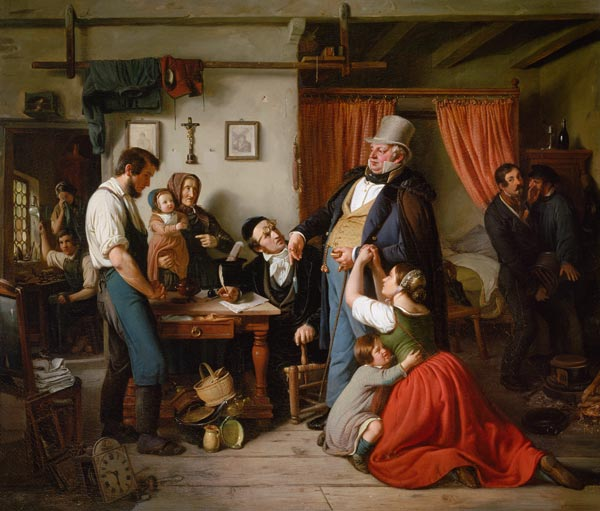
A distraint in progress, depicted in an 1846 painting by Peter Schwingen

Distraint or distress is "the seizure of someone's property in order to obtain payment of rent or other money owed", especially in common law countries. Distraint is the act or process "whereby a person (the distrainor), traditionally even without prior court approval, seizes the personal property of another located upon the distrainor's land in satisfaction of a claim, as a pledge for performance of a duty, or in reparation of an injury." Distraint typically involves the seizure of goods (chattels) belonging to the tenant by the landlord to sell the goods for the payment of the rent. In the past, distraint was often carried out without court approval. Today, some kind of court action is usually required, the main exception being certain tax authorities – such as HM Revenue and Customs in the United Kingdom and the Internal Revenue Service in the United States – and other agencies that retain the legal power to levy assets (by either seizure or distraint) without a court order.

== History ==
Article 61 of Magna Carta extended the law of distraint to the monarch's properties, including "our castles, lands, possessions, or anything else saving only our own person and those of the queen and our children".

In England in 1267 the Statute of Marlborough was passed making distraint unlawful without a court order.

Chapter 1 [of the Statute of Marlborough 1267] provided that all persons "as well of high as of low estate" were to receive justice in the King's court. No individual was to be entitled to seek "revenge or distress of his own authority" against his neighbour for any damage or injury suffered without first obtaining an award from the court.

Distress in this context was (and still is) a summary remedy designed to secure performance of an obligation or settlement of an outstanding debt. First, it was the bedrock of the notion that all citizens, irrespective of rank, were entitled to seek civil justice through the king's court or courts. Secondly, it laid down a prohibition on individuals taking the law into their own hands and seeking remedies (revenge or distraint) without the court's sanction. That prohibition was reinforced with criminal penalties.

== Procedure ==
The goods are held for a given amount of time, and if the rent is not paid, they may be sold. The actual seizure of the goods may be carried out by the landlord, the landlord's agent, or an officer of the government, a bailiff or sheriff officer in the United Kingdom or a sheriff or marshal in the United States.

Certain goods are protected against distraint; these are called "privileged goods". Such goods include, for example, goods belonging to the state, fixtures, goods delivered to the tenant or debtor for business purposes, the goods of a guest, perishable goods (e.g. food), livestock, gas, water, electricity, and tools of the tenant's trade.

Forced entry is usually not permitted by the distraint officer, but in the UK, in the event of entry being refused to the HMRC distraint officer, HMRC can apply for a break open warrant under section 61(2) of the Taxes Management Act 1970. This permits forced entry to the debtor's premises by the HMRC distraint officer. Any additional costs incurred from obtaining the warrant are passed onto the debtor and added to the debt to be collected by distraint.

Also in the UK, forced entry is also permitted if the distraint warrant is for amounts of a criminal nature, for instance court fines. The use of forced entry for these purposes is covered in the Domestic Violence, Crime and Victims Act 2004.

== In various countries ==
=== United Kingdom ===
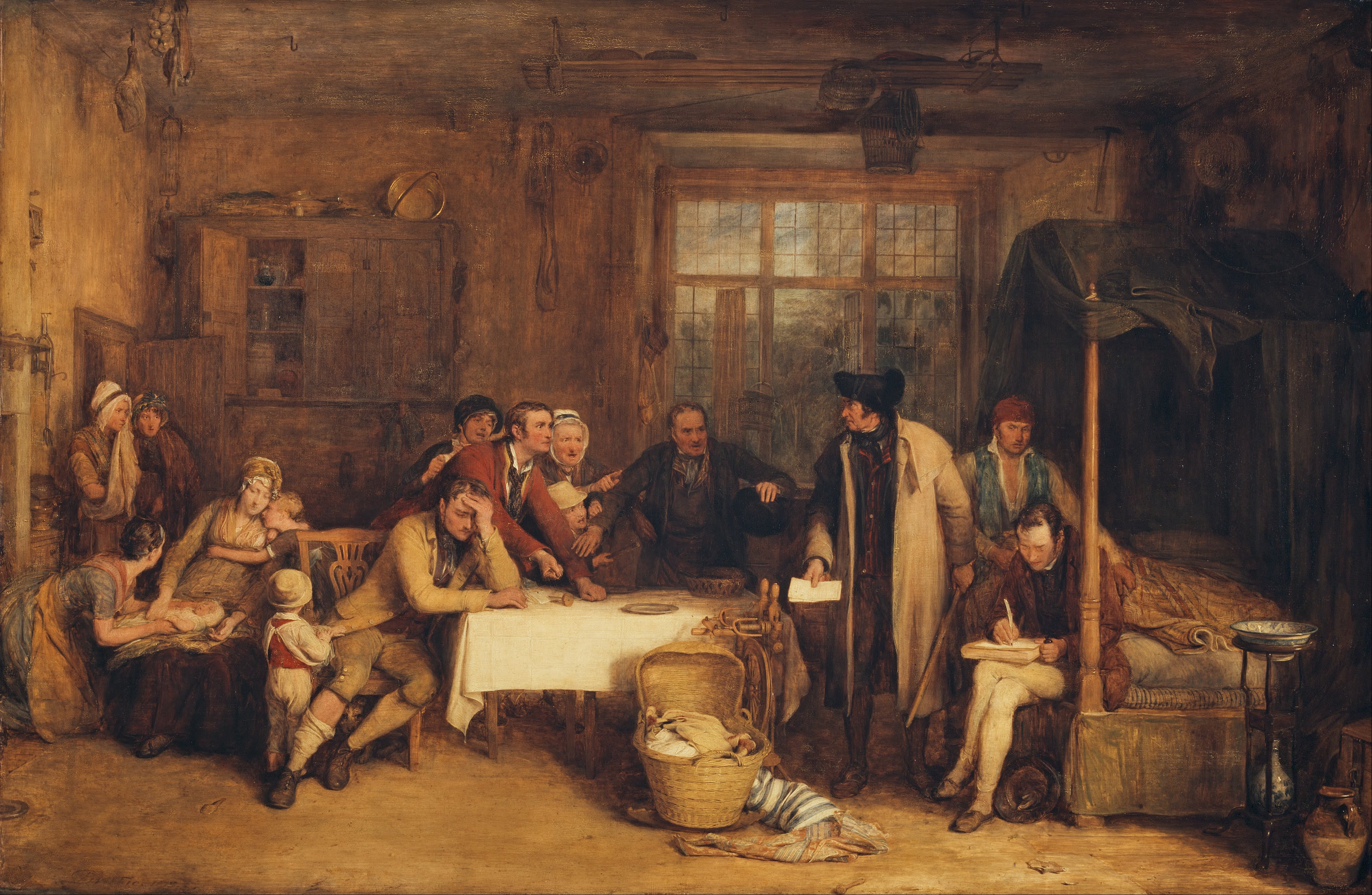
Distraining for Rent by David Wilkie, 1815

In the United Kingdom the proposals which have been implemented to reduce the area to post-warrant executions by registered court bailiffs (enforcement officers) gained serious traction in the late 20th century.

In post-warrant execution and former civil distress concerns were regularly expressed that certain instances of distraint violate human rights, such as Article 8 of the European Convention on Human Rights, the right to respect for private life. The Lord Chancellor's Department (now the Ministry of Justice) in May 2001 issued Enforcement Review Consultation Paper No. 5: Distress for Rent, which spurred the abolition of distraint for residential leases and reduced it to peaceable re-entry, that is closing down of commercial premises and no taking of goods, by authorised, registered bailiffs ("enforcement officers") in commercial property subject to safeguards – to ensure compliance with the Human Rights Act 1998.

It was thought that distraint would be abolished in the UK when section 71 of the Tribunals, Courts and Enforcement Act 2007 came into force, replacing it, solely for leases on commercial property, by a statutory system of commercial rent arrears recovery (CRAR). (The Tribunals, Courts and Enforcement Act 2007 received royal assent in July 2007 but no date for implementation was published. A commencement order in 2012 followed which brings into force sections 93 and 94 of the act (on 1 October 2012 and 17 May 2012 respectively), which amend the Charging Orders Act 1979.)

Bailiffs must provide evidence of their identification upon request by the debtor, as a well as sight of the warrant providing them with authority to enter. They must also legally give the debtor an enforcement notice seven days before they visit. In contrast, private sector debt collectors can chase a debtor to pay what is owed to a creditor, but they cannot levy distraint. Debt collectors are not allowed to pretend to be a bailiff. Debtors can also check the register of certificated bailiffs if they are unsure about whether a bailiff is certificated or not.

Practices relating to distraint are now referred to as "taking control of goods" and governed by the Taking Control of Goods Regulations 2013 (SI 2013/1894).

=== United States ===
Distraint was adopted into the United States common law from England, and it has recently been challenged as a possible violation of due process rights under the Fourteenth Amendment. In decisions like Luria Bros. and Co. v. Allen, 672 F.2d 347 (3d Cir. 1982), however, the courts have upheld the rule because, as a landlord's self-help remedy, distraint involves no state action and thus cannot violate due process rights. In the case of distraint by the federal government for collection of taxes, the power of administrative levy by distraint dates back to the year 1791, according to the U.S. Supreme Court.

=== Sweden ===
In Sweden, distraint (utmätning) is performed by the Swedish Enforcement Authority. Bank assets and similar are taken first, but if needed the Enforcement Authority can visit people's homes, assisted by the police. Goods needed for an acceptable standard of living are protected, like clothes, TV-sets and stoves. Protected items that are expensive can be replaced with cheaper, and excess items can be taken. Goods found in the home, but belonging to others, e.g. to a romantic partner, can also be taken unless it is proven who it belongs to. Homes can be forcibly sold (exekutiv auktion), and everyone living there might be evicted.

== See also ==
- Attachment (law)
- Collection agency
- Foreclosure
- Quia Emptores
- Repossession
- Self-help (law)
- Sequestration (law)
- Tax levies
- Warrant sale
