= Judgment (law) =

Formal decision made by a court

In law, a judgment is a decision of a court regarding the rights and liabilities of parties in a legal action or proceeding. Judgments also generally provide the court's explanation of why it has chosen to make a particular court order.

Speakers of British English tend to use the term at the appellate level as synonymous with judicial opinion. American English speakers prefer to maintain a clear distinction between the opinion of an appellate court (setting forth reasons for the disposition of an appeal) and the judgment of an appellate court (the pronouncement of the disposition itself).

In Canadian English, the phrase "reasons for judgment" is often used interchangeably with "judgment," although the former refers to the court's justification of its judgment while the latter refers to the final court order regarding the rights and liabilities of the parties.

== Spelling ==
Judgment is considered a "free variation" word, and the use of either judgment or judgement (with an e) is considered acceptable. This variation arises depending on the country and the use of the word in a legal or non-legal context. British, Australian, New Zealand, American, and Canadian English generally use judgment when referring to a court's formal ruling. Judgement is commonly used in the United Kingdom when referring to a non-legal decision. Translations from non-English texts demonstrate varied spelling of the word. For instance, the English translation of France's Code of Civil Procedure uses "judgement" throughout.

== Who renders a judgment ==
The legal definition of "judgment" contemplates decisions made by judges in a court of law. Decisions of quasi-judicial bodies and administrative bodies may also be colloquially referred to as "judgments," but they must be distinguished from true judgments in that they are not made by judges in courts of law. Judgments must also be distinguished from arbitral awards, which are made by arbitral tribunals.

== Form of judgments ==
A judgment may be provided either in written or oral form depending on the circumstances.

Oral judgments are often provided at the conclusion of a hearing and are frequently used by courts with heavier caseloads or where a judgment must be rendered quickly.

Written reasons for judgment are often provided in circumstances where a complex decision must be made, where the matter is likely to be appealed, or where the decision is considered to be of some significant importance to members of the legal community and/or the public at large. Written reasons for judgment are not generally provided immediately following the hearing and may take days, weeks, or even months to be released.

== Types of judgments ==
Types of judgments can be distinguished on a number of grounds, including the procedures the parties must follow to obtain the judgment, the issues the court will consider before rendering the judgment, and the effect of the judgment. Judgments that vary from a standard judgment on the merits of a case include the following:

- Consent judgment: also referred to as an "agreed judgment", a consent judgment is a settlement agreed upon by the parties and authorized by a judge. Consent judgments are often used in the regulatory context, particularly in antitrust and environmental cases.
- Declaratory judgment: a judgment that determines the rights and liabilities of the parties without enforcing a judgment or otherwise requiring the parties to do anything. A declaratory judgment may be useful where the parties have differing views about their rights and duties or are wishing to clarify them without seeking any other remedy. It has been suggested, at least in the United States, that a declaratory judgment is a "milder" form of an injunction order because it clarifies the parties' rights without actually directing the parties to do anything. Though a declaratory judgment is not binding, it is expected that the parties will act in accordance with what the court determines in its judgment.
- Default judgment: a judgment rendered in favour of one party based on the other party's failure to take action. Default judgments are commonly used where the defendant fails to appear before the court or submit a defence after being summoned. A default judgment grants the relief requested by the appearing party and does not require extensive factual or legal analysis from the court.
- Interlocutory judgment: an intermediate or interim judgment providing a temporary decision on an issue that requires timely action. Interlocutory orders are not final and may either not be subject to appeal or may follow a different appeal procedure than other kinds of judgments.
- Reserved judgment or reserved decision: a judgment that is not given immediately after the conclusion of the hearing or trial. A reserved judgment may be released days, weeks, or even months after the hearing. In the United States, a reserved judgment is sometimes annotated in law reports by the Latin phrase "Cur. adv. vult." or "c.a.v." (Curia advisari vult, "the court wishes to be advised").
- Summary judgment: an accelerated judgment that does not require a trial and in which the court's interpretation of the pleadings forms the basis of the judgment. For a summary judgment, the court will consider "the contents of the pleadings, the motions, and additional evidence adduced by the parties to determine whether there is a genuine issue of material fact rather than one of law."
- Vacated judgment: a judgment of an appellate court whereby the judgment under review is set aside and a new trial is ordered. A vacated judgment is rendered where the original judgment failed to make an order in accordance with the law and a new trial is ordered to ensure a just outcome. The process of vacating a judgment is sometimes referred to as vacatur. The result of a vacated judgment is a trial de novo.

== Opinions within judgments ==
If more than one judge is deciding a case, the judgment may be delivered unanimously or it may be divided into a number of majority, concurring, plurality, and dissenting opinions. Only the opinion of the majority judgment is considered to have precedent-setting weight. Some examples of opinions within judgments include:

- Majority opinion: the opinion of more than half of the judges deciding a case. This opinion becomes precedent for future cases as it represents the views of the majority of the court.
- Concurring opinion: the opinion of a single judge or judges that agrees with the final outcome of the majority opinion but disagrees in whole or in part with the reasoning.
- Plurality opinion: the opinions of different judges of the court when a majority judgment is not obtained. An example of a plurality opinion is a court of three judges each rendering a different concurring decision, agreeing on a final outcome but disagreeing on the reasons justifying that final outcome.
- Dissenting opinion: the opinion of a single judge or judges that rejects the conclusions of the majority decision in whole or in part, and explains the reasons for rejecting the majority decision.

== Enforcement of judgments ==
When a court renders a judgment, it may state that the successful party has a right to recover money or property. However, the court will not collect the money or property on behalf of the successful party without further action. In common law legal systems, judgment enforcement is regulated by administrative divisions such as a province, territory, or federated state, while in civil law legal systems judgment enforcement is regulated through the national Code of Civil Procedure. Judgment enforcement, on a conceptual level, is conducted in a similar way across different legal systems. Specific references to the judgment enforcement rules of Germany, Canada (Saskatchewan), and the United States (California) are made in this section.

The successful party may receive immediate payment from the unsuccessful party on the basis of the judgment and not require further action. A successful party who does not receive immediate payment must initiate a judgment enforcement process in order to collect the money or property that they are entitled to under the judgment. Once this process is initiated, the successful party may be referred to as the judgment creditor while the unsuccessful party will be referred to as the judgment debtor in North America.

Judgment creditors can register their judgments through the property registry system in their jurisdictions, levy the property in question through a writ of execution, or seek a court order for enforcement depending on the options available in their jurisdiction.

Judgment creditors may also need to investigate whether judgment debtors are capable of paying. Understanding whether a judgment debtor is capable of fulfilling the judgment order may affect the enforcement mechanism used to recover the money or property. Some steps are available in different jurisdictions to investigate or interview judgment creditors, and investigations may be conducted either by the judgment creditor or by a sheriff or bailiff.

Different enforcement mechanisms exist, including seizure and sale of the judgment debtor's property or garnishment. Some jurisdictions, like California, also allow for additional enforcement mechanisms depending on the circumstances, such as suspending the judgment debtor's driver's license or professional license. In Germany, a bailiff is responsible for enforcing the judgment and is empowered to use a number of different enforcement mechanisms.

In Germany, the judgment creditor is entitled to enforce the judgment 30 years past the judgment date. In California and Saskatchewan, the judgment creditor is entitled to enforce the judgment 10 years past the judgment date subject to exceptions that allow the judgment creditor to renew the enforcement for an additional 10 years.

Release of judgments

Depending on the jurisdiction, the judgment debtor may be able to obtain a "satisfaction and release of judgment" document from the judgment creditor. This document affirms that the judgment debtor has fulfilled any obligations relating to the judgment.

For example, in California, a judgment creditor must file an "Acknowledgment of Satisfaction of Judgment" where it has been paid in full by the judgment debtor within 15 days of the judgment debtor's request. This document has the effect of formally closing the case and terminating any ongoing garnishment arrangements or liens. In Saskatchewan, upon either the satisfaction or withdrawal of a judgment, a judgment debtor can seek a discharge of judgment. If successful, the judgment is removed from the Judgment Registry and detached from any property registered on the Personal Property registry, titles, or interests in land.

== Judgments by legal system ==
The requirements for judgments share many similarities and some differences between countries and legal systems. For instance, while the civil law imposes a statutory requirement to provide reasons for judgment, the common law recognizes a contextual duty to provide reasons depending on certain circumstances. The following section provides some information regarding judgments in different jurisdictions as well as examples of their treatment of other types of judgments, where available.

=== Common law ===
==== Australia ====
At the State level various State and Territory Courts allow for parties to obtain different types of judgments; including:

- Default judgment - if a defendant in a proceeding started by claim has not filed a notice of intention to defend and the time allowed under the State of Territory's rules;
- Summary judgment - A party may, at any time after a defendant files a notice of intention to defend, apply to the court under this part for judgment against the other party, if the court is satisfied that—
  - the party has no real prospect of succeeding on all or a part of the plaintiff’s claim; and
  - there is no need for a trial of the claim or the part of the claim.

However, a Court may set aside a default judgment if the defendant can prove a number of key issues. In Queensland, in Unique Product Marketing Pty Ltd v Bortek Sales Pty Ltd [2000] QDC 314 Shanahan DCJ set-down some principles in relation to setting aside a regularly entered default judgment. They include:

1. Whether there is a good reason why the defendant failed to file a defence;
2. Whether there has been any delay by the defendant in bringing the application;
3. The defendant’s conduct in the action before and after judgment;
4. The defendant’s good faith;
5. Whether the defendant has raised a prima facie defence on the merits; and
6. Whether the plaintiff would be irreparably prejudiced if the judgment is set aside which cannot be adequately compensated by a suitable award of costs.

==== Canada (excluding Quebec) ====
The Supreme Court of Canada has recognized a common law duty to provide "adequate" reasons for judgment and has stated that "the giving of reasoned judgments is central to the legitimacy of judicial institutions in the eyes of the public." Determining whether reasons for judgment are adequate is a contextual exercise that may call for different information or depth of reasoning based on the circumstances of the case. In general, Canadian courts are expected to provide reasons for judgment as a duty to the public at large, to demonstrate that the judge or judges have engaged with the parties' pleadings, to explain why the parties won or lost, and to allow for meaningful appellate review (in the event that the case may be appealed).

With the above guiding principles in mind, Canadian courts must "read [the reasons] as a whole, in the context of the evidence, the arguments and the trial, with an appreciation of the purposes or functions for which they are delivered..." to determine whether the reasons for judgment are adequate. The reasons must tell the reader why the judgment was made, but do not need to tell the reader how the judge made the decision rendered in the judgment.

Provincial rules of civil procedure provide further guidance relating to specific types of judgments. For example:

- Declaratory judgment: a declaratory judgment can be made by the court regardless of whether a remedy is being claimed.
- Default judgment: a default judgment can be sought by the plaintiff where a defendant “has been noted in default” for certain claims.
- Summary judgment: a summary judgment may be available if “there is no genuine issue requiring a trial with respect to a claim or defence” or if “the parties agree to have all or part of the claim determined by a summary judgment and the court is satisfied that it is appropriate to grant summary judgment.”

==== Hong Kong ====
In Mak Kang Hoi v Ho Yuk Wah David, the Hong Kong Court of Final Appeal stated that 'litigants are entitled to have their cases decided with reasonable promptitude'. The Court considered that the 'extraordinary' and 'inordinate' delay of 30 months which the trial judge (Madam Recorder Gladys Li SC) took in handing down her reserved judgment was 'wholly excessive' and 'extremely regrettable', and recognised that 'it may lead to a denial of justice as a Judge's memory of the evidence, the witnesses, the submissions and the trial itself may fade with time', but nonetheless upheld her decision as it was 'objectively sound'.

Similarly, in Dr Yip Chi Him Roger v Lee Kwok Leung, the trial judge (Mr Justice Louis Chan) delivered his reserved judgment over 32 months after the trial. The Court of Appeal held that 'notwithstanding the regrettable delay in giving judgment, we come to the firm and clear view that the Judge gave cogent and adequate reasons for his findings and there is no error of law or facts in his findings', and dismissed the appeal.

Delays have occurred in a number of judicial review cases. For example, in Data Key Ltd v Director of Lands, Lui Yuet Tin v Commissioner for Transport and DI v Director of Immigration, Mr Justice Au handed down his reserved judgment 26 to 28 months after the hearing.

The Court of Appeal has on occasion delivered its reasons for judgment a significant period of time after the hearing. For example, in China Medical Technologies v Samson Tsang Tak Yung, the reasons for judgment, as well as the reserved decision as to costs, were delivered by Mr Justice Barma, JA after a delay of 34 months.

Similar delays have also been encountered in cases in the District Court. For example, in Leung Chi Wang v Leung Yui Shing (decided by Deputy District Judge Richard Leung), Kan Yay Shan v Mo You Mut (decided by Deputy District Judge Simon Lui), Golden Field Glass Works v Yeung Chun Keung (decided by Deputy District Judge Timon Shum), and Han Mei Fang v All Occupiers of Flat F, 6th Floor, Kapok Mansion (decided by Deputy District Judge Samson Hung), judgment was handed down between 31 and 33 months after the trial.

In Welltus v Fornton Knitting, after a trial which lasted 12 days, the trial judge (Deputy High Court Judge Ian Carlson) took over 10 months to hand down his reserved judgment. The Court of Appeal held that the trial judge failed to give adequate reasons for his decision and stated that 'the failure to deal with [one of the critical issues was] probably attributable to the delay in the preparation of the judgment'. The Court of Appeal therefore set aside the decision and ordered a re-trial before another judge of the Court of First Instance.

In HKSAR v Yip Kim Po, after a criminal trial lasting over one year, the trial judge (His Honour Judge Kevin Browne) gave Reasons for Verdict with 1,753 paragraphs spanning 465 pages. The Court of Appeal stated that the 'sheer length of the judge's Reasons for Verdict brings with it considerable difficulties for the appeal courts and any other newcomer to the case in trying to unravel the relevant evidence and identify the real issues at trial. An unduly lengthy set of Reasons also creates problems for the judge himself in focussing on the essential issues at trial so as to explain, clearly, concisely and expediently, why he came to the decision he did'. The Hong Kong Court of Final Appeal endorsed the remarks made by the Court of Appeal, and stated that 'Whilst a judge should keep a record of the evidence and submissions, it is not the function of a judgment to be that record. Instead, the primary purpose of a judgment is: to identify the ultimate issues in the case; to set out, qualitatively by reference to the evidence that is accepted or rejected, the primary facts which the judge finds; to relate those findings to the factual issues in the case; to show how any inference has been drawn; to make the necessary findings of fact; to identify and apply the appropriate legal principles; and, ultimately, to make the appropriate dispositive orders'.

In HKSAR v Tin's Label Factory Ltd, at the end of the hearing of the appeal in the Court of First Instance, Mr Justice Pang Kin-kee immediately delivered an oral decision allowing the appeal, with written reasons to be handed down at a later date. 7 months later, the Judge handed down the written reasons for judgment dismissing the appeal, a result which was inconsistent with the oral decision announced at the end of the hearing. After the appellant contacted the Judge's clerk, later the same day the Judge retracted the 'incorrect version' and delivered the 'correct version' of the written reasons for judgment. The correction was made before the court order and record had been perfected. The Hong Kong Court of Final Appeal stated that 'It must be reiterated and strongly emphasised that judges at all levels of court have a duty to deliver judgments within a reasonable time after the conclusion of the hearing. Where an oral decision has been given of the result, with reasons to follow later, it is incumbent upon the judge to deliver the reasons within a reasonable time. This is important not only for the parties, but it is essential to the maintenance of public confidence in the administration of justice. In the present case, the delay of seven-and-a-half months was unjustified'. The Hong Kong Court of Final Appeal further stated that 'In handing down the 1st written judgment purporting to set out his reasons for "dismissing" the appeal on 15 May 2008, the Judge must have forgotten about his earlier oral decision allowing the appeal and omitted to check the file. The delay in preparing his reasons must have contributed to this oversight'.

==== New Zealand ====
In accordance with section 170 of the Senior Courts Act 2016, the Chief Justice of New Zealand, the President of the Court of Appeal and the Chief High Court Judge publish information about the indicative delivery times for reserved judgments in the Supreme Court, Court of Appeal and High Court respectively. As of 2017, the Supreme Court 'will endeavour to deliver judgment in an appeal within six months from the last day of the hearing'. In the Court of Appeal and the High Court, most decisions are delivered within three months of the last day of the hearing.

==== United Kingdom ====
The Court of Appeal of England and Wales (Civil Division) has affirmed a common law duty to give reasons for a judgment, subject to some exceptions (such as an oral judgment or a summary judgment). The Court also noted that providing reasons for judgment "is a function of due process, and therefore of justice." Interested parties must be able to determine why the court has made the decision in question. Furthermore, providing reasons for judgment serves a practical purpose insofar as it necessarily requires the court to engage in thoughtful consideration of the cases presented. However, the Court also noted that the exercise of providing reasons for judgment is contextual and the standard of what is acceptable for a judgment will vary depending on the circumstances. The court appears to propose that the ultimate requirement is the court explaining, in some way, why it has made the decision in question.

The UK Supreme Court has stated that where there has been a relatively long and expensive hearing/trial, it is important that the judgment (i) clearly identifies all the issues of fact and expert opinion that are in issue, and (ii) resolves in clear terms all such issues which are relevant on the judge's view of the law, and those issues which would be relevant if the judge's view of the law turns out to be wrong. Otherwise, there is a real risk of a complete or partial rehearing being ordered, which would bring the administration of law into disrepute.

Further, The Civil Procedure Rules 1998 state that a judgment or order takes effect on the day it is rendered unless the court specifies otherwise and provide additional guidance on different types of judgments.

- Consent judgment: a consent judgment is available where the parties agree on the terms of the judgment or order that should be made.
- Declaratory judgment: a declaratory judgment can be made by the courts regardless of whether a remedy is being claimed.
- Default judgment: a default judgment is available where the defendant does not file acknowledgment of service or fails to file a defence. A default judgment may be set aside or varied if he defendant demonstrates “a real prospect of successfully defending the claim” or where exceptional circumstances apply.
- Summary judgment: a summary judgment is made without requiring a trial. A court may grant a summary judgment if either the claimant or the defendant has no prospect of succeeding and “there is no other compelling reason why the case or issue should be disposed of at a trial.”

==== United States ====
At the federal level, a judgment is defined in the United States Federal Rules of Civil Procedure as "a decree and any order from which an appeal lies" and does not include "recitals of pleadings, a master's report, or a record of prior proceedings."

A judgment must address all of the issues raised with respect to the rights and liabilities of the parties. If a judgment is rendered without addressing all the rights and liabilities, the action is not ended and the claims of the parties may be revised before the entry of a judgment that determines all of the issues raised.

- Default judgment: If the defendant fails to plead or otherwise defend against the action, a default judgment may be entered. If the plaintiff's claim is for a fixed amount of money, then the plaintiff can request that the clerk enter judgment for that amount along with costs against the defendant. Otherwise, the plaintiff will be required to appear before the court and present evidence for the damages or relief requested to receive a default judgment. If the defendant can demonstrate "good cause" for not responding to the default judgment, then the court may set aside the judgment at its discretion.
- Interlocutory injunction: A party can seek an interlocutory injunction relating to a proceeding. The court must provide reasons for either granting or denying an interlocutory injunction.
- Summary judgment: A party can seek a summary judgment on all or part of its claim. The court will grant a summary judgment if the party seeking the judgment demonstrates that there is no real dispute regarding the facts. The court must provide reasons for either granting or denying a summary judgment.

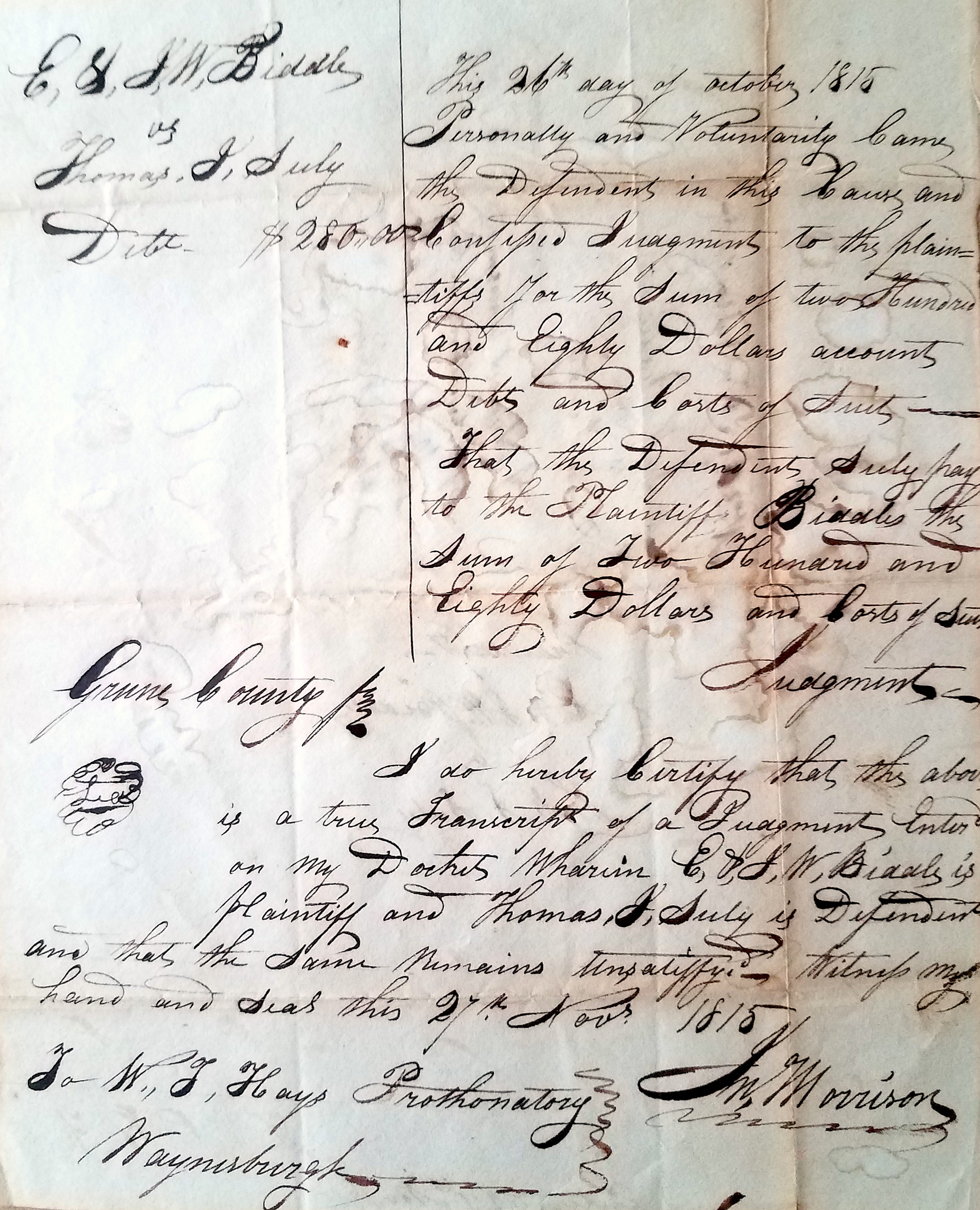
Judicial judgment of debt, Greene County, Pennsylvania, 1815

A state code of civil procedure provides its own rules relating to judgments in state courts. For instance, California's Code of Civil Procedure provides some general rules regarding the purpose of and requirements for judgments as well as rules relating to summary judgments, default judgments, and interim or interlocutory judgments.

The Full Faith and Credit Clause of the federal Constitution generally requires states to recognize the records and judgments of other states.

=== Civil law ===
==== France ====
A court's duties regarding judgments are outlined in the Code de procédure civile. A judgment "is given on behalf of the French people" and must contain certain information, including the date, the names of the judges, the level of court, and the names of the parties involved. A judgment must also describe the parties' claims and the grounds on which their claims are based, identifying both the final judgment and the reasons for the judgment. In light of compliance with the rules of the Code and the absence of an appeal, a judgment is presumed to have been executed correctly.

Traditional French judgments often consisted of a single sentence wherein the court provided its judgment. However, a drive towards modernization of French judgments has encouraged judges to write much clearer judgments to encourage simplification and accessibility. Modern French judgments generally include "[a] recounting [of] the facts, the procedure and the claims of the parties, as a narrative ... Such judgments may also be divided to deal with each element of the claim separately." Generally, French judgments are much shorter than their common law counterparts.

A court may either provide their judgment at the end of the hearing or defer the judgment to a specified date. If an oral judgment is rendered, it must be read by at least one of the judges who heard the case. Parties to the proceedings are entitled to receive "a certified copy of the judgement imprinted with an order of enforcement." Once a judgment has been executed, it becomes res judicata. A judgment will be enforced once it becomes final subject to some exceptions. A judgment can only be enforced once a certified copy imprinted with an order of enforcement is provided and the affected parties have been notified.

- Default judgment: If one of the parties does not appear before the court, or one of the parties does not present their pleadings within the enumerated time limit, the appearing party is entitled to receive a default judgment on the merits of the case.
- Ex parte judgment: an ex parte judgment may be granted "where the petitioner has good reason for not summoning the opposing party."
- Interlocutory Judgment: An interlocutory judgment, insofar as it gives rise to an investigation or an interim measure, stays the proceedings and does not equate to a final judgment.
- Summary judgment: a summary judgment may be granted at the request of one party in order to provide an order quickly as an alternative to a full trial.

==== Germany ====
A court's duties regarding judgments are outlined in the Zivilprozessordnung. A trial judgment must contain certain information, including the parties and their representatives, the court and judges involved in the decision, the date the proceedings finished, the merits of the case and the reasons for the judgment. Specifically, the legislation requires that "the claims asserted and the means of challenge or defence [be] brought before the court, highlighting the petitions filed. The details of the circumstances and facts as well as the status of the dispute thus far are to be included by reference being made to the written pleadings, the records of the hearings, and other documents ... [and] a brief summary of the considerations of the facts and circumstances of the case and the legal aspects on which the decision is based."

An appellate court judgment must include the findings of fact in the contested judgment, including any changes or amendments, and the reasons for the court's determination of the appeal.

- Default judgment: a default judgment is rendered based on the defendant's acknowledgment of their actions. A default judgment does not need to address the facts or merits of the case and does not require the provision of reasons.
- Interlocutory judgment: an interlocutory judgment is rendered when the court has enough information to make a decision. An interlocutory judgment is considered to be a final judgment and not subject to appeal unless the court deems further consideration necessary.

Judgments in most German courts are rendered "in the name of the people".

==== Italy ====
The duty to provide reasons for a judgment is entrenched in Italy's Constitution.

==== Japan ====
A court's duties regarding judgments are outlined in "民事訴訟法及び民事保全法の" (Code of Civil Procedure). The Code states that a final judgment must be made "when the suit is ripe for making a judicial decision." The judgment must contain the names of the parties, the court, the final date of oral argument, the facts, and the reasons for decision subject to some exceptions. A judgment must be rendered within two months of the conclusion of oral arguments unless exceptional circumstances apply and becomes effective once it has been rendered.

=== Religious law ===
==== Saudi Arabia ====
A court's duties regarding judgments are outlined in The Law of the Judiciary. Judgments must be pronounced in a public hearing and must "include the grounds on which they were based and the legal authority thereof." A judgment may be rendered unanimously or by a majority vote. If the judgment contains a dissent, the majority decision in the judgment must address the dissenting opinion, and any dissenting judges must explain why they are dissenting.

Once a judgment has been issued, the judge or judges determine whether the parties involved agree with the ruling. If one party disagrees with the judgment, that party has a set number of days to request a written appeal. An appellate body will then review the judgment in the absence of the parties. If the appellate body agrees with the lower court's decision, it will stamp "final and enforceable" on the judgment without providing any reasons and will return the judgment to the trial court. If the appellate body disagrees with the lower court's decision, it may either send the case back to the trial court for reconsideration or, less commonly, may call the parties to present further arguments and write its own judgment based on the information presented.

== See also ==
- Defendant
- Judicial interpretation
- Procedural history
- Plaintiff
- Question of law
- Standing (law)
- Trier of fact
