= Judgment creditor =

A judgment creditor is a party to which a debt is owed that has proved the debt in a legal proceeding and that is entitled to use judicial process to collect the debt. A creditor becomes a "judgment creditor" when a judgment is rendered stating that they are entitled to recover a particular debt from a judgment debtor. Following a judgment, a judgment debtor may satisfy the debt voluntarily or the judgment creditor may need to take additional steps to enforce the judgment.
