= Judgment debtor =

In English and American law, a judgment debtor is a person against whom a judgment ordering him to pay a sum of money has been obtained and remains unsatisfied. Such a person may be examined as to their assets, and if the judgment debt is of the necessary amount he may be made bankrupt if he fails to comply with a bankruptcy notice (in US law, an involuntary petition) served on him by the judgment creditors.

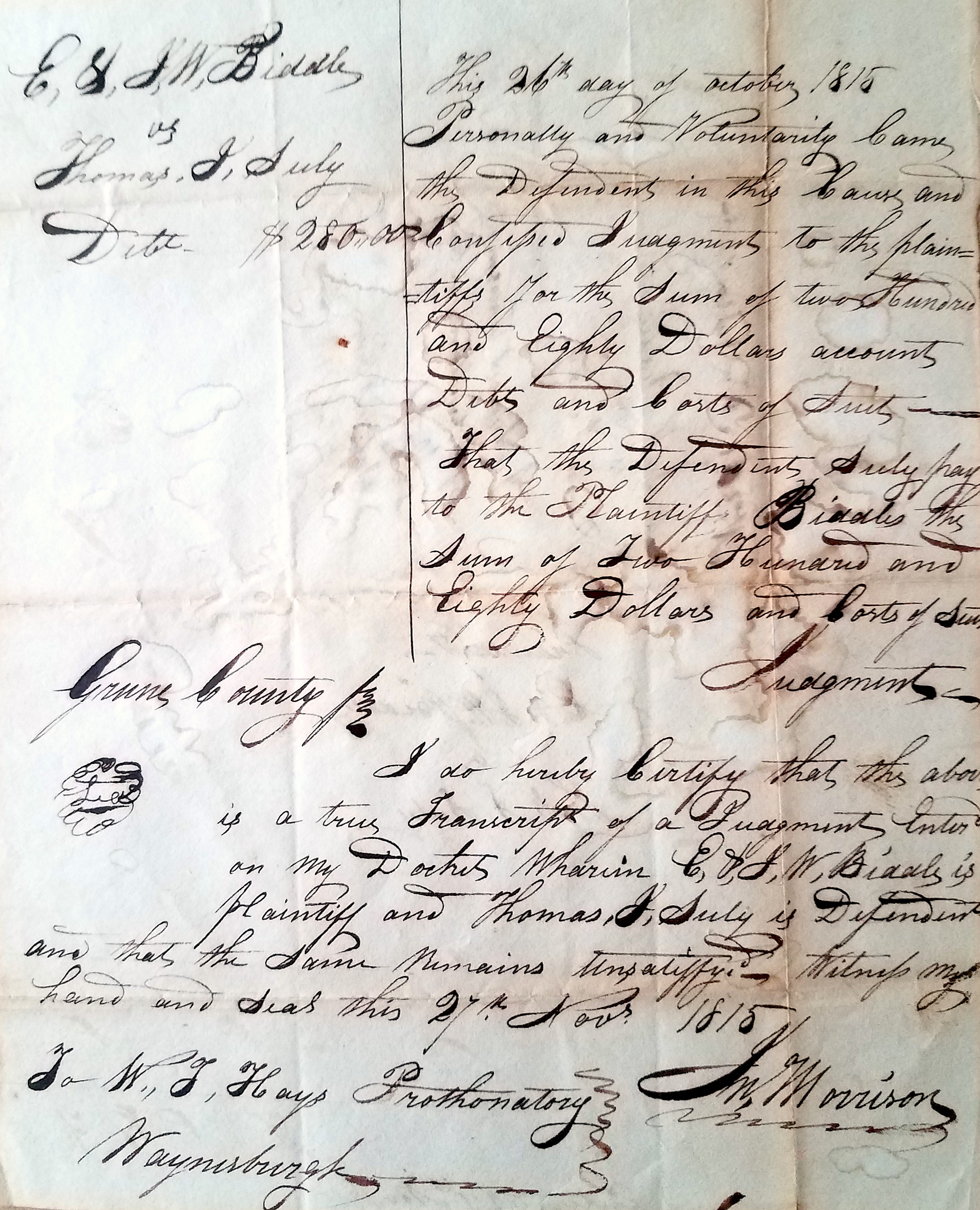
Judicial Judgment of Debt, Greene County, Pennsylvania, 1815

In the past, the judgment debtor could have been committed to prison or have a receiving order made against him in a judgment summons under the Debtors Act 1869.

Specific debts are non-dischargeable, such as debts for fraud and civil judgments that are obtained in a civil Adversary proceeding in bankruptcy. During such proceedings (US law) the judge who presides over the bankruptcy declares that a specific debt be deemed non-dischargeable, in that the bankruptcy will not dismiss the debt, and the debtor is obligated for the full amount of the judgment for life.

Examinations, referred to as judgment debtor exams or a JDX of the debtor are conducted in front of a district court judge, and the debtor is required to answer questions about his or her assets, or face the possibility of imprisonment for contempt of court.
