= Small Debts, Middlesex Act 1749 =

Act of the Parliament of Great Britain

- Act of Parliament
- Parliament of Great Britain
- Long title: An Act for preventing Delays and Expences in the Proceedings in the County Court of Middlesex, and for the more easy and speedy Recovery of small Debts in the said County Court.
- Citation: 23 Geo. 2. c. 33
- Territorial extent: Great Britain

Dates
- Royal assent: 12 April 1750
- Commencement: 24 June 1750 (Note: Section 1.)
- Repealed: 28 August 1846
Other legislation
Repealed by	County Courts Act 1846

Status: Repealed

Text of statute as originally enacted

The Small Debts, Middlesex Act 1749 (23 Geo. 2. c. 33) was an act of the Parliament of Great Britain that reorganised the county court of the county of Middlesex.

The act allowed twelve freeholders summoned to the county court of Middlesex to decide small claims (debts or damages less than 40 shillings) by a majority and in a summary way.

The act was described by Blackstone:

"This is a plan entirely agreeable to the constitution and genius of the nation: calculated to prevent a multitude of vexatious actions in the superior courts, and at the same time to give honest creditors an opportunity of recovering small sums; which now they are frequently deterred from by the expense of a suit at law: a plan which, in short, wants only to be generally known, in order to it's universal reception."

== Background ==
Sheriffs of the county counts of the county of Middlesex had authority to hear small claims (debts or damages less than 40 shillings), finding the process to be annoying, costly and slow.

== Provisions ==
The act enacted that:

- From 24 June 1850, suitors of the county court and the county clerk may determine suits for debt under 40 shillings summarily and examine parties under oath.
- From 24 June 1850, the Sheriff of Middlesex, through his county clerk, has authority to hold county court every Thursday in the Hundred of Ossulston, the first Tuesday of each month in either the Hundred of Isleworth or Elthorne and on the last Tuesday of each month in the Hundred of Edmonton.
- Eligibility to participate as suitors is limited to those qualified to serve as jurors in trials held in the courts of King's Bench, Common Pleas and Exchequer.
- From 24 June 1850, removal of cases from the county court to a higher court was restricted, making orders and decisions final, except in replevin (disputes over the return of property) cases.
- Any plaintiff or defendant who fails to comply with court orders after being summoned can be imprisoned for up to 3-months.
- When the court orders a payment, the county clerk can issue a Fieri Facias to enforce judgement and collect money through a bailiff.
- From 24 June 1850, the under-sheriff must provide three lists of twelve freeholders every month to the county clerk to summon these individuals to attend court at most once a year.
- If a summoned juror fails to attend court without a valid excuse, the county clerk may fine them up to 20 shillings, with the fine going to the parish poor fund.
- Residents of the hundreds of Gore, Elthorne, Spelthorne or Isleworth are not obliged to attend as suitor or defendant any court apart from the hundreds of Isleworth or Elthorne. Residents of the hundred of Edmonton are not obliged to attend as suitor or defendant any court apart from the hundred of Elthorne.
- Suitors must take an oath to impartially hear and determine matter brought before the court.
- Suitors or the county clerk can fine anyone who disturbs the court can be fined up to 40 shillings or detained, with the fine going to the parish poor fund.
- The county clerk must take the specified fees to be publicly hung in each county court.
- The county clerk must be a barrister of 3 years standing and be approved by representatives of the higher courts, and that William Whitaker continue to be county clerk.
- The county clerk must take an oath, swearing to faithfully execute the office and not delay justice.
- The county clerk can appoint a deputy, who must also be a barrister of 3 years standing and take an oath.
- If the county clerk misbehaves, a petition can be made to the Lord Chancellor, Lord Keeper or Commissioners of the Great Seal to remove them from office.
- Those who commit wilful and corrupt perjury may be prosecuted.
- In case of legal actions against court officers, they may plead the general issue and give evidence under the act.
- For actions brought in the county court, if damages are found to be under 40 shillings, the plaintiff cannot recover costs unless the judge certifies the action was proper.
- The act does not extend to the Tower of London, Tower Hamlets and the city and liberty of Westminster.

== Subsequent developments ==
The whole act was repealed by section 5 of the County Courts Act 1846 (9 & 10 Vict. c. 95).
