= County court =

Type of court

A county court is a court based in or with a jurisdiction covering one or more counties, which are administrative divisions (subnational entities) within a country, not to be confused with the medieval system of county courts held by the high sheriff of each county.

== England and Wales ==
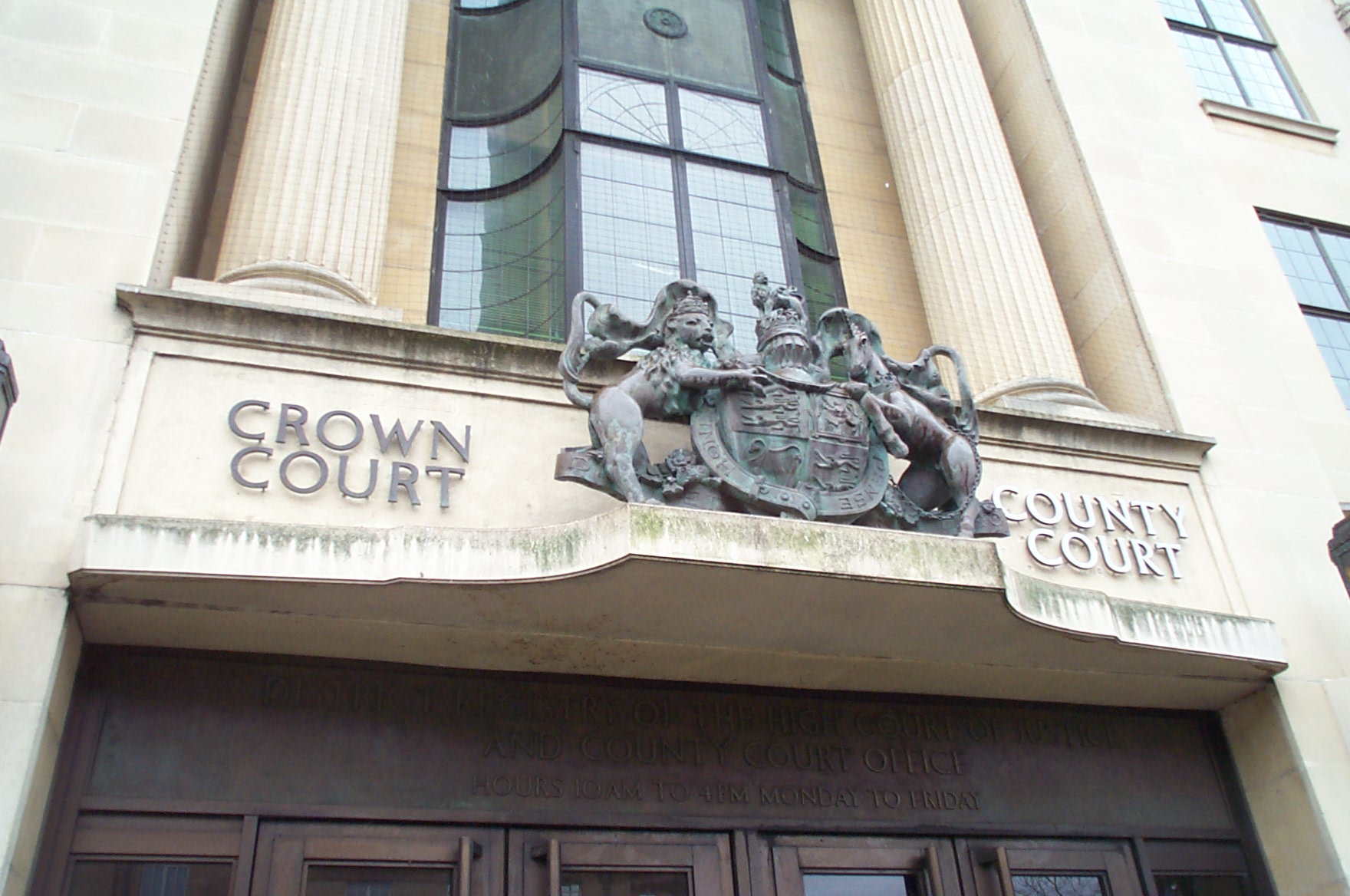
Court building in Oxford used by the Crown Court and County Court.

Since 2014, England and Wales have had what is officially described as "a single civil court" named the County Court, with unlimited financial jurisdiction. However it should be understood that there are County Court buildings and courtrooms throughout England and Wales, not one single location. It is "a single civil court" in the sense of a single centrally organised and administered court system. Before 2014 there were numerous separate county court systems, each with jurisdiction across England and Wales for enforcement of its orders, but each with a defined "county court district" from which it took claims. County court districts did not have the same boundaries as counties: the name was used because the county courts had evolved from courts which did in fact correspond to a county's territory. Today the court sits in many County Court centres, currently corresponding to the old individual county courts.

County Court matters can be lodged at a court in person, by post or via the internet in some cases through the County Court Bulk Centre. Cases are normally heard at the court having jurisdiction over the area where the claimant lives. Most matters are decided by a district judge or circuit judge sitting alone. Civil matters in England (with minor exceptions, e.g. in some actions against the police) do not have juries. Judges in the County Court are either former barristers or former solicitors, whereas in the High Court they are more likely to have formerly been a barrister.

Civil claims with an amount in controversy under £10,000 (the Jackson Reforms have increased this from £5,000) are dealt with in the County Court under the small claims track (sometimes known to the lay public as "small claims court," although it is not a separate court). Claims between £10,000 and £25,000 (£15,000 for cases started before April 2009) that are capable of being tried within one day are allocated to the "fast track" and claims over £25,000 (£15,000 for cases started before April 2009) to the "multi track." These 'tracks' are labels for the use of the court system - the actual cases will be heard in the County Court or the High Court depending on their value. For personal injury, defamation, and some landlord-tenant dispute cases the thresholds for each track have different values.

Appeals are to a higher judge (a circuit judge hears district judge appeals), the High Court of Justice or to the Court of Appeal, as the case may be.

In debt cases, the aim of a claimant taking County Court action against a defendant is to secure a County Court judgment. This is a legal order to pay the full amount of the debt. Judgments can be enforced at the request of the claimant in a number of ways, including requesting the court bailiffs to seize goods, the proceeds of any sale being used to pay the debt, or an Attachment of Earnings Order, where the defendant's employer is ordered to make deductions from the gross wages to pay the claimant.

County Court judgments are recorded in the Register of Judgments, Orders and Fines and in the defendant's credit records held by credit reference agencies. This information is used in consumer credit scores, making it difficult or more expensive for the defendant to obtain credit. In order to avoid the record being kept for years in the register, the debt must be settled within thirty days after the date the County Court judgment was served (unless the judgment was later set aside). If the debt was not fully paid within the statutory period, the entry will remain for six full years.

== Australia ==
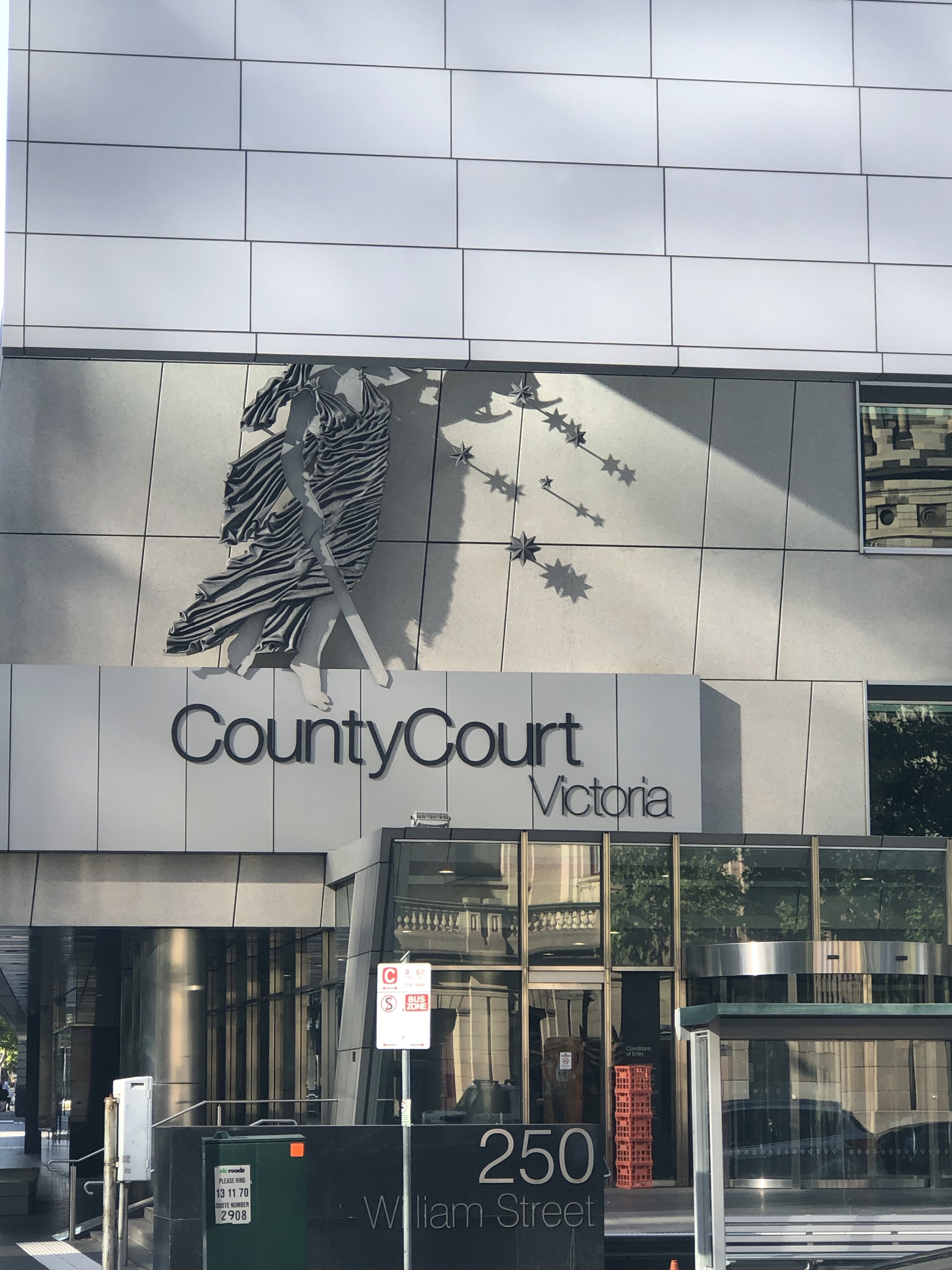
The County Court of Victoria in Melbourne, Australia

County court is the name given to the intermediate court in one Australian state, namely the County Court of Victoria (in other states and territories it is called the 'District Court'). They hear indictable (serious) criminal offences except for treason, murder, and manslaughter. Their civil jurisdiction is also intermediate, typically over civil disputes where the amount claimed is greater than a few tens of thousands of dollars but less than a few hundreds of thousands of dollars. The limits vary between states. In some states the same level of court is called a district court. Below them are the magistrates courts. Above them are the state supreme courts. Some states adopt the two-tier appellate system, with the magistrates courts below and the state supreme courts above.

== Island of Ireland ==
In early 19th-century Ireland, the court at the level of the county was called the Assistant Barrister's Court or Civil Bill Court, having jurisdiction over most civil matters, except for the larger actions which were heard by the High Court of Justice in Ireland or the assizes. Each county employed an Assistant Barrister to preside over its court. The name Civil Bill Court reflected a difference in procedure from that in England and Wales, with claims being initiated by means of a civil bill. The County Officers and Courts (Ireland) Act, 1877, replaced the Assistant Barristers with "county court judges", and also merged the offices of Clerk of the Crown and Clerk of the Peace into a single administrative officer of the county court called the Clerk of the Crown and Peace. Most matters were tried by a county court judge, and where necessary, a jury. The 1921–1922 Partition of Ireland created two Irish jurisdictions, but the civil bill is still used as the initiation document for claims in the relevant court in both jurisdictions.

=== Irish Free State ===
After the Constitution of the Irish Free State came into force in 1922, the old court system continued on a transitional basis until the Courts of Justice Act 1924 replaced it wholesale; the officers and pending cases of the old county courts were transferred to the new Circuit Court. The main administrative officer of each circuit is now the county registrar.

=== Northern Ireland ===
In Northern Ireland there are seven county courts, following the same model as those which existed in England and Wales before unification in 2014. These are the main civil courts. While higher-value cases are heard in the High Court, the county courts hear a wide range of civil actions, consumer claims, and appeals from magistrates' courts. The county courts are called family care centres when hearing proceedings brought under the Children (Northern Ireland) Order 1995 and appeals from the family proceedings courts.

== United States ==
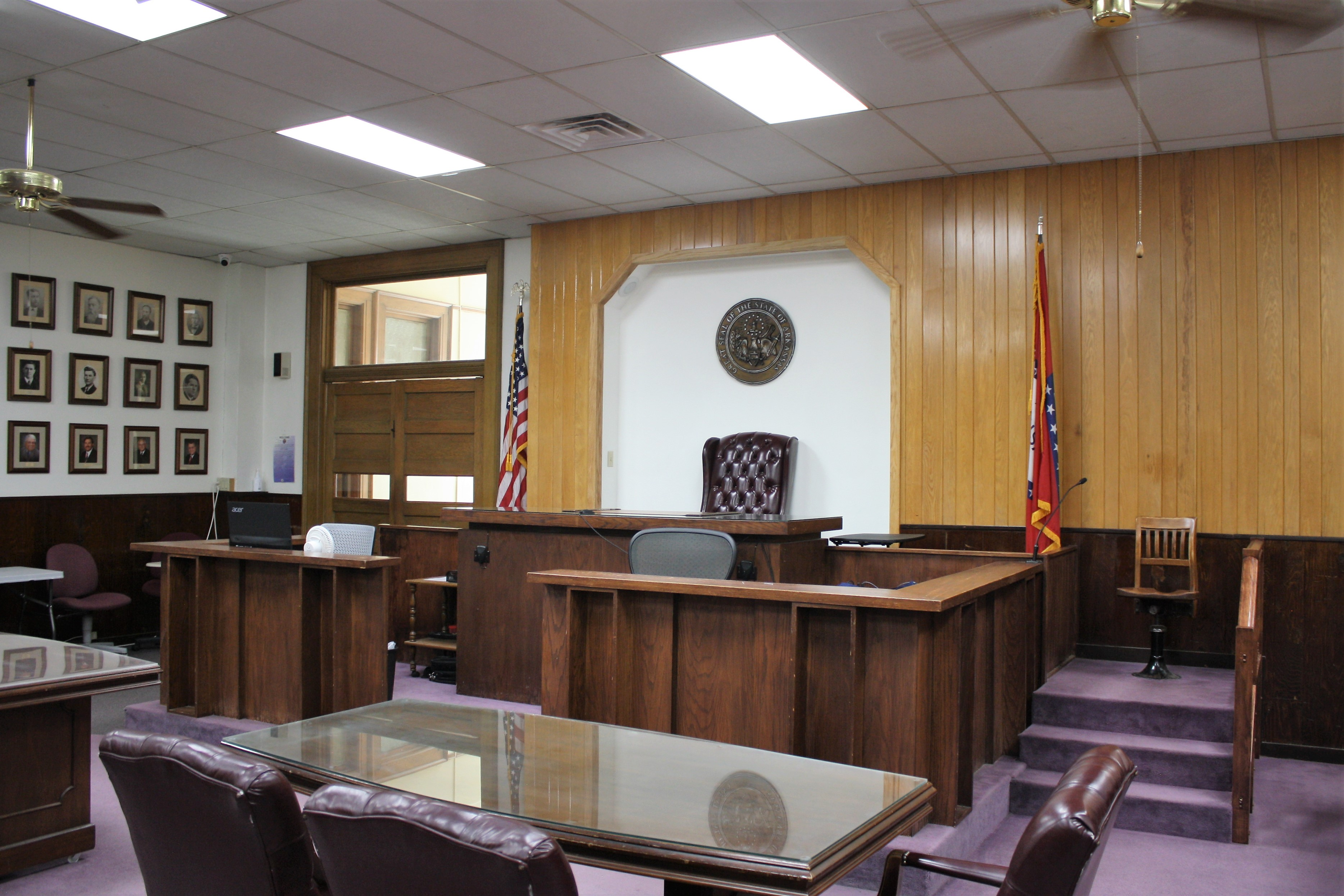
Inside the Boone County Courthouse in Boone County, Arkansas

Many United States states have a county court system which, least common, may be purely administrative (such as in Missouri), focused primarily on registration of properties and deeds, or, most often, may have jurisdiction over civil cases such as lawsuits and criminal courts and jails (such as in New York, Massachusetts, Pennsylvania, et cetera) where trials from misdemeanors to felony cases are centered about a common jail system managed by the county sheriffs departments. For example, in Texas, county courts exclusively handle Class A and B misdemeanors (these carry jail time as well as fines), share jurisdiction with justice of the peace and district courts on some mid-size civil cases, and have appellate jurisdiction from municipal and justice of the peace court cases.

With the growth of the largest cities, many large urban centers have subsumed whole or most of counties within the unofficial or official municipal borders, blurring the distinction between the types of government and their jurisdictions in the mind of the common inhabitant, but even television police drama's occasionally point out a county function (coroners, sheriffs, jails, courts, probation departments) different from a metropolis' police agencies, city governments, and district attorney's (prosecutors) offices (politically elected or appointed in most of the United States).

In those states with an administrative county court, the body acts as the executive agency for the local government. For example, Harry S. Truman was county judge of Jackson County, Missouri, in the 1930s, an executive position rather than a judicial post. The County Commissioners in Pennsylvania and Massachusetts manage the county government, including funding civil and criminal courts, jails and Sheriffs departments overseeing said jails, as well as recording deeds, maintaining county roads and the like. In point of fact, each state has adjusted local governments powers and interactions to suit their own needs, so no one model is uniform even within the same state when the county is interfacing with a major city.

In counties of Tennessee, the primary legislative body was called a county court until the ratification by the voters of the state of the constitutional amendments of 1978, which change the term for this body in all but consolidated city-counties to county commission. Colloquially, the county commission is still frequently referred to as the "county court", particularly in rural areas. (The analogous body in consolidated city-counties is the metropolitan county council, usually shortened to "Metro council".) Likewise, five counties in Oregon are governed by a county court.

In Florida's four-tiered court system, the lower two tiers split original jurisdiction for both criminal and civil matters. broadly speaking, the jurisdiction of "county courts" is limited to misdemeanors and civil actions involving amounts in controversy less than $15,000.00, while the "circuit courts" handle felonies and larger civil cases.

=== Municipal blendings ===
In the states that have a judicial county court, such as New York, it generally handles trials for felonies, as well as appeals of misdemeanors from local courts and some small claims cases. It is a court of original jurisdiction, and thus handles mostly trials of accused felons. The New York County Court "is established in each county outside New York City. It is authorized to handle the prosecution of all crimes committed within the County. The County Court also has limited jurisdiction in civil cases ...." More specifically, the New York County Court is:

authorized to handle the prosecution of all crimes committed within the county. It has exclusive authority to handle trials in felony matters and shares authority with the local city, town and village courts to handle trials in misdemeanor cases (offenses punishable by less than one year in prison) and other minor offenses and violations. The County Court also has limited authority to hear civil cases involving monetary awards of $25,000 or less. Although the County Court is primarily a trial court, in the Third and Fourth Departments it also has appellate jurisdiction over cases originating in City, Town and Village Courts.

In New York City, the New York City Criminal Court handles such jurisdiction.

Otherwise in the United States, the courts of original jurisdiction in most states have jurisdiction over a particular county, parish, shire, or borough (comparable area entities in the various states of the USA); in other cases, instead of being called "county court" they are called "district courts" or "circuit courts" with a hierarchy of state "superior court" districts up to that state's 'supreme court'. Multiple courts of typically limited original jurisdiction within a county are usually called "district courts" or, if located in and serving a particular municipality, "municipal courts"; and are subordinate to the county superior or circuit court. In New York, 'superior'/'circuit' courts are called "supreme court". The court that in other US jurisdictions is called "supreme court" is called "court of appeal" in New York, Maryland and the District of Columbia.

== See also ==
- List of County Court venues in England and Wales
- County court bailiff
- Judiciary of England and Wales
- Judiciary of New York
