= 1701 in England =

- Centuries: 16th; 17th; 18th; 19th; 20th
- Decades: 1680s; 1690s; 1700s; 1710s; 1720s
- See also: Other events of 1701

Events from the year 1701 in the Kingdom of England.

== Incumbents ==
- Monarch of England — William III

== Events ==
- 6 February — the 5th Parliament of William III assembles; future Prime Minister Robert Walpole enters the House of Commons for the first time, and soon makes his name as a spokesman for Whig policy.
- 23 May — Scottish-born Captain William Kidd, having been imprisoned in Boston Gaol (Massachusetts) and Newgate Prison (London) and convicted by the High Court of Admiralty of piracy and the murder of one of his crew, is hanged at Execution Dock in Wapping. His body suffers gibbeting over the River Thames at Tilbury Point; ballads are already spreading the legend that he has left buried treasure in the Americas.
- 16 June — foundation of the Society for the Propagation of the Gospel in Foreign Parts in London.
- 24 June — the Act of Settlement 1701, by the Parliament of England, becomes law; the crown of Great Britain passes to Sophia, Electress of Hanover and her Protestant descendants on the death of Princess Anne, the heiress presumptive to the throne after her brother-in-law, King William III.
- 7 September — the Treaty of Grand Alliance signed between England, Austria, and the Dutch Republic.
- 16 September (N.S.) — following the death of the deposed King James II of England in exile in France, his son Prince James Francis Edward Stuart becomes the new claimant to the thrones of England as King James III and Scotland as King James VIII; Louis XIV of France, the Papal States, and Philip V of Spain recognise him as the rightful heir.
- December — Nicholas Rowe's play Tamerlane premieres at the Lincoln's Inn Fields Theatre in London; its pro-Whig views make it popular amongst supporters of King William and the Glorious Revolution.

=== Undated ===
- HMS Royal Sovereign, a 100-gun first-rate ship of the line built by Fisher Harding at Woolwich Dockyard in 1701 for the Royal Navy, is launched.
- Jethro Tull invents a drill for planting seeds in rows.
- Opening of the Bevis Marks Synagogue in London, the oldest synagogue in the United Kingdom in continuous use.

== Births ==
- 14 May — William Emerson, mathematician (died 1782)
- 19 December — Francis Ayscough, clerk of the Closet (died 1763)

=== Unknown birth date ===
- Harriet Pelham-Holles, Duchess of Newcastle-upon-Tyne, née Lady Harriet Godolphin, spouse of the Prime Minister (died 1776)

== Deaths ==
- 4 April — Joseph Haines, entertainer and author (date of birth unknown)
- 20 August — Charles Sedley, playwright (born 1639)
- 22 August — John Granville, 1st Earl of Bath, royalist statesman (born 1628)
- 16 September — James II of England, deposed king (born 1633)
- 3 October — Joseph Williamson, politician (born 1633)
- 5 November — Charles Gerard, 2nd Earl of Macclesfield, French-born English politician (born c. 1659)
