= County Court judgment =

Judgements in the jurisdiction of England and Wales

In England and Wales, County Court judgments (CCJs) are legal decisions handed down by the County Court. Judgments for monetary sums are entered on the statutory Register of Judgments, Orders and Fines, which is checked by credit reference agencies to assess the credit-worthiness of individuals.

An alleged debtor is sent postal notification of an impending County Court case, and has fourteen days to respond, by paying the money, admitting owing a smaller sum, or by defending the claim. If there is no response judgement will be granted against the debtor.

If the debtor does not make payment in response to a CCJ, the creditor may apply for a charging order, which would secure the debt on a property. Creditors can also apply for an attachment of earnings order which would oblige the debtor's employer to deduct monies from their salary and send them to the court. A third-party debt order would oblige a third party who holds money belonging to the debtor (for example a bank) to pay the debt. It is also possible to have the court appoint a County Court bailiff to collect the debt.

== Impact on credit reference agency information ==
Once a CCJ has been entered, if not paid in full within thirty days it is kept on record for six years by the register and credit reference agencies (CRAs); there is no way to expunge the record of a correctly granted CCJ, although later payment will be recorded. The record is removed after six years.

In some cases a CCJ is made against someone who did not receive the notification of the court case, often due to it being sent to an incorrect or former address, and is not aware of the judgement; this may lead to unexpected refusal of credit. Checking of the Register or CRA records will find such cases.

The records can be checked by anybody on payment of a small fee. When a person applies for credit or finance, potential creditors normally check CRA records, refusing applicants considered to have a bad credit history; a CCJ on record makes it much more difficult to obtain finance through the normal channels. Some lenders will lend to people with CCJs against them, but usually on unfavourable terms, e.g. through a very expensive payday loan.

== Mitigation ==
If regular payments to the court are being made this is recorded on the credit file in addition to the record of the CCJ, and goes some way to lessen the negative credit rating impact. Once the full amount owed is repaid the CCJ is marked as 'satisfied', but remains on file. The record of a CCJ which is satisfied within one month can be removed altogether on application to the Register (and hence the CRAs).

== Other legislation ==
From October 2017, all creditors in the UK are expected to follow the Pre-Action Protocol for Debt Claims, which sets out what a debtor is expected to do and sets out a time limit for the creditor and debtor to reach an agreement over the debt. This must be done before a court order for a County Court judgment for the debt can be made against a debtor.

== See also ==
- European Payment Order
