= Court of Requests =

Minor equity court in England and Wales from the late 15th to the mid-17th centuries

The Court of Requests was a minor equity court in England and Wales. It was instituted by King Richard III in his 1484 parliament. It first became a formal tribunal with some Privy Council elements under Henry VII, hearing cases from the poor and from servants of the King. It quickly became popular for its low cost of bringing a case and rapid processing time, earning the disapproval of the common law judges. Two formal judges, the "Masters of Requests Ordinary", were appointed towards the end of Henry VIII's reign, with an additional two "Masters of Requests Extraordinary" appointed under Elizabeth I to allow two judges to accompany her on her travels around England (Latin: Regiae Majestati a Supplicum Libellis Magister). Two more ordinary masters were appointed under James I of England, with the increasing volume of cases bringing a wave of complaints as the court's business and backlog grew.

The court became embroiled in a dispute with the common law courts during the late 16th century, who were angry at the amount of business deserting them for the Court of Requests. During the 1590s they went on the offensive, overwriting many decisions made by the Requests and preventing them from imprisoning anyone. It is commonly accepted that this was a death-blow for the court, which, dependent on the Privy Seal for authority, died when the English Civil War made the seal invalid.

== History ==
The precise origins of the Court of Requests are unknown. Spence traces it back to the reign of Richard II, Leadam, rejecting Spence's case, claims there is no official record of the court's existence before 1493, Pollard writes (based on documents discovered after Leadam's work) that it was in existence from at least 1465, while Alexander writes that it first appeared during the reign of the House of York, and Kleineke states that it was created in 1485 by Richard III. Whatever its origin, the court was created as part of the Privy Council, following an order by the Lord Privy Seal that complaints and cases brought to the council by the poor should be expedited. This was as part of the Privy Council; it first became an independent tribunal with some Privy Council elements under Henry VII, with jurisdiction mainly over matters of equity. The court became increasingly popular due to the lack of cost in bringing a case to it and the speed at which it processed them, in contrast with the slow and expensive common law courts, arousing the ire of common law lawyers and judges.

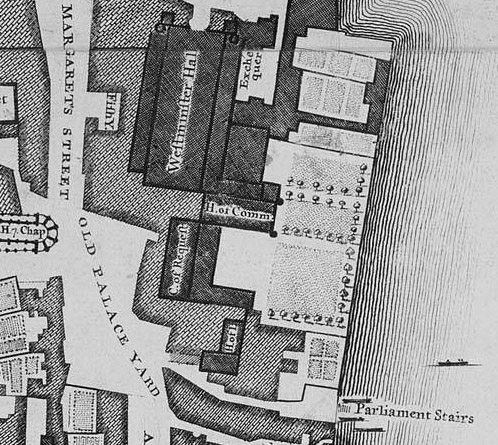
The Old Palace of Westminster showing where the Court of Requests met

The court originally followed the monarch on his travels around England, visiting Sheen, Langley and Woodstock in 1494. Under Thomas Wolsey the court became fixed in Westminster, hearing cases from poor people and from the servants of the king. It met at the White Hall of the Palace of Westminster and was often referred to as the Court of White Hall. Towards the end of Henry VIII's reign, the court assumed a more professional status with the appointment of two "Masters of Requests Ordinary" to serve as its judges, where the Lord Privy Seal alone had previously heard and delivered judgements. Two additional "Masters of Requests Extraordinary" were appointed under Elizabeth I to accompany her on her progresses around England. Under James I two further Ordinary Masters were appointed, but despite this the court was criticised for the backlog arising from its increasing business.

When the court formally became an independent body in the 16th century, free of Privy Council control, it immediately became vulnerable to attack by the common-law courts, which asserted that it had no formal jurisdiction and that the Court of Chancery was an appropriate equitable body for cases. It was technically true that the court, as it was no longer part of the Privy Council, could not claim jurisdiction based on tradition, but in 1597 Sir Julius Caesar (then a Master of Requests Ordinary) gave examples of times when the common law courts had recognised the Court of Requests' jurisdiction as recently as 1585. The common law courts change of heart was undoubtedly due to the large amount of business deserting them for the Court of Requests, and in 1590 they went on the offensive; writs of habeas corpus were issued for people imprisoned for contempt of court in the Requests, judgments were issued in cases the Court of Requests were dealing with and it was decided that jailing an individual based on a writ from the Court of Requests constituted false imprisonment. Most academics accept that the court never recovered from these blows, and when the English Civil War made the privy seal inoperative, the court "died a natural death". The post of Master of Requests was abolished in 1685.

== Other courts of requests ==
=== City of London ===
City of London Court of Conscience Act 1603
- Act of Parliament
- Parliament of England
- Long title: An Act for Recovery of Small Debts and relieving of poor Debtors in London.
- Citation: 1 Jas. 1. c. 14 (Note: This is the citation in The Statutes of the Realm.); 2 Jas. 1. c. 14 (Note: This is the citation in The Statutes at Large.)
- Territorial extent: England and Wales

Dates
- Royal assent: 7 July 1604
- Commencement: 19 March 1604 (Note: Start of session.)
- Repealed: 30 September 1835
Other legislation
Repealed by	City of London Court of Requests Act 1835
Relates to	City of London Court of Conscience Act 1605

Status: Repealed

Text of statute as originally enacted

City of London Court of Conscience Act 1605
- Act of Parliament
- Parliament of England
- Long title: An Act for the recovering of small Debts, and for the relieving of poor Debtors in London.
- Citation: 3 Jas. 1. c. 15
- Territorial extent: England and Wales

Dates
- Royal assent: 27 May 1606
- Commencement: 6 January 1606
- Repealed: 30 September 1835
Other legislation
Amended by	Small Debts (London) Act 1740
Repealed by	City of London Court of Requests Act 1835
Relates to	City of London Court of Conscience Act 1603

Status: Repealed

Text of statute as originally enacted

Another court of requests was by act of the Common Council of the City of London on 1 February 1518. It had jurisdiction over small debts under 40 shillings between citizens and tradesmen of the City of London. The judges of the court were two aldermen and four ancient discreet commoners. It was also called the Court of Conscience in the Guild Hall, where it met. Under James I, acts of Parliament were passed regulating its procedure, the City of London Court of Conscience Act 1603 (1 Jas. 1. c. 14) and the City of London Court of Conscience Act 1605 (3 Jas. 1. c. 15). These were the first acts of Parliament that gave validity to a court of requests. It was abolished by the London (City) Small Debts Act 1847 (10 & 11 Vict. c. lxxi), which transferred small debts process to the ancient Sheriff's Court.

=== Elsewhere in England ===
Norwich Court of Requests Act 1700
- Act of Parliament
- Parliament of England
- Long title: An Act for erecting a Court of Request, or Conscience, in the City and County of the City of Norwich, for the Recovery of small Debts under Forty Shillings.
- Citation: 12 & 13 Will. 3. c. 7 Pr.
- Territorial extent: England and Wales

Dates
- Royal assent: 12 June 1701
- Commencement: 6 February 1701

Status: Current legislation

Small Debts, Southwark, etc. Act 1748
- Act of Parliament
- Parliament of England
- Long title: An Act for the more easy and speedy Recovery of small Debts, within the Town and Borough of Southwark, and the several Parishes of Saint Saviour, Saint Mary at Newington, Saint Mary Magdalen Bermondsey, Christ Church, Saint Mary Lambeth, and Saint Mary at Rotherhith, in the County of Surry, and the several Precincts and Liberties of the same.
- Citation: 22 Geo. 2. c. 47
- Territorial extent: Great Britain

Dates
- Royal assent: 13 June 1749
- Commencement: 29 November 1748
- Repealed: 28 August 1846
Other legislation
Amended by	Small Debts, Southwark, etc. Act 1758; Southwark and East Brixton Court of Requests Act 1806; Southwark Court of Requests Act 1823
Repealed by	County Courts Act 1846

Status: Repealed

Text of statute as originally enacted

Small Debts, Southwark, etc. Act 1758
- Act of Parliament
- Parliament of Great Britain
- Long title: An Act to explain and amend an Act passed in the Twenty-second Year of His present Majesty's Reign, intituled, "An Act for the more easy and speedy Recovery of Small Debts, within the Town and Borough of Southwark, and the several Parishes of Saint Saviour, Saint Mary at Newington, Saint Mary Magdalen Bermondsey, Christ Church, Saint Mary Lambeth, and Saint Mary at Rotherhith, in the County of Surrey, and the several Precincts and Liberties of the same;" and for extending the Powers and Provisions of the said Act to such Part of the Eastern Half of the Hundred of Brixton, in the said County, as is not included in the said Act.
- Citation: 32 Geo. 2. c. 6
- Territorial extent: Great Britain

Dates
- Royal assent: 23 March 1759
- Commencement: 23 November 1758
- Repealed: 28 August 1846
Other legislation
Amends	Small Debts, Southwark, etc. Act 1748
Repealed by	County Courts Act 1846

Status: Repealed

Text of statute as originally enacted

Westminster Court of Requests Act 1836
- Act of Parliament
- Parliament of the United Kingdom
- Long title: An Act to repeal Two Acts of the Reign of King George the Second, for the Recovery of Small Debts within the City and Liberty of Westminster, and for granting more effectual Powers for that Purpose.
- Citation: 6 & 7 Will. 4. c. cxxxvii
- Territorial extent: United Kingdom

Dates
- Royal assent: 19 August 1836
- Commencement: 19 August 1836 (Note: The Acts of Parliament (Commencement) Act 1793.)
- Repealed: 28 August 1846
Other legislation
Repeals/revokes	Small Debts, Westminster Act 1749; Small Debts, Westminster Act 1750
Repealed by	County Courts Act 1846

Status: Repealed

Text of statute as originally enacted

Crediton Court of Requests Act 1845
- Act of Parliament
- Parliament of the United Kingdom
- Long title: An Act for the more easy and speedy Recovery of Small Debts within the Town of Crediton in the County of Devon, and other Places in the same County.
- Citation: 8 & 9 Vict. c. lxxix
- Territorial extent: United Kingdom

Dates
- Royal assent: 30 June 1845
- Commencement: 30 June 1845
- Repealed: 28 August 1846
Other legislation
Repealed by	County Courts Act 1846

Status: Repealed

In the 18th and early 19th century small claims courts were established in various parts of England called "court of requests". The first of these was founded in Southwark by the Small Debts, Southwark, etc. Act 1748 (22 Geo. 2. c. 47). They were abolished by the County Courts Act 1846 (9 & 10 Vict. c. 95).

At the time of abolition, the schedule to the County Courts Act 1846 listed the following courts of requests/small claims courts as existing:

- Ashton-under-Lyne [The Court of Requests for the Parish of Ashton-under-Lyne, in the County Palatine of Lancaster, and the several Townships of Stayley, Hattersley, Matley, Newton, and Dukinfield, in the County Palatine of Chester – Ashton-under-Lyne, &c. Court of Requests Act 1808 (48 Geo. 3. c. xcviii)]
- Bath [Small Debts (Bath) Act 1766 (6 Geo. 3. c. 16); Bath Court of Requests Act 1805 (45 Geo. 3. c. lxvii)]
- Beverley [The Court of Requests for the Town and Liberties of Beverley – Beverley Court of Requests Act 1806 (46 Geo. 3. c cxxxv)]
- Birmingham [The Court of Requests for the Town of Birmingham, and Hamlet of Deritend – Small Debts, Birmingham Act 1751 (25 Geo. 2. c. 34); Birmingham and Deritend Court of Requests Act 1807 (47 Geo. 3 Sess. 1. c. xiv)]
- Blackheath [Small Debts, Blackheath, etc. Act 1765 (5 Geo. 3. c. 8); Small Debts, Kent, etc. Act 1766 (6 Geo. 3. c. 6); Blackheath, etc., Small Debts Act 1770 (10 Geo. 3. c. 29); Blackheath, &c. Court of Requests Act 1807 (47 Geo. 3 Sess. 1. c. iv)]
- Bolingbroke and Horncastle [Bolingbroke, &c. Court of Requests Act 1807 (47 Geo. 3 Sess. 2. c. lxxviii)]
- Boston [Boston (Lincolnshire) Court of Requests Act 1807 (47 Geo. 3 Sess. 2. c. i)]
- Bradford [Bradford (Wiltshire), &c. Court of Requests Act 1807 (47 Geo. 3 Sess. 2. c. xxxix)]
- Bristol Court of Requests (Note: The Bristol Court of Requests covered debts between £2 and £15.) [The Court of Requests for the City and County of the City of Bristol, and the Liberties thereof, and the several Parishes and Out Parishes of Clifton, Saint James, and Saint Paul, and Saint Philip, and Jacob, and the Tithing of Stoke Bishop, in the Parish of Westbury-upon-Trym in the County of Gloucester, and the Parish of Bedminster, in the County of Somerset – Bristol Court of Requests Act 1816 (56 Geo. 3. c. lxxvi)]
- Bristol Court of Conscience (Note: The Bristol Court of Conscience was less formal, and covered debts of up to £2.) [The Court of Conscience for the City and County of Bristol – Bristol and Gloucester Courts of Conscience Act 1688 (1 Will. & Mar. c. 18 Pr.); Bristol Court of Conscience Act 1837 (7 Will. 4 & 1 Vict. c. lxxxiv)]
- Brixton [The Court of Requests in and for the Western Division of the Hundred of Brixton, in the County of Surrey – Brixton Small Debts Act 1757 (31 Geo. 2. c. 23); West Brixton Court of Requests Act 1806 (46 Geo. 3. c. lxxxviii)]
- Broseley [The Court of Requests for the parishes of Broseley, Benthall, Madeley, Barrow Linley, Willey, Little Wenlock, and Dawley, and an extraparochial place called Posnall, in the county of Salop – Salop (Small Debts) Act 1782 (22 Geo. 3. c. 37)]
- Canterbury [Small Debts, Canterbury Act 1751 (25 Geo. 2. c. 45)]
- Chippenham [Small Debts, Chippenham Act 1765 (5 Geo. 3. c. 9)]
- Cirencester [Gloucestershire Small Debts Act 1792 (32 Geo. 3. c. 77)]
- Codsheath [The Court of Requests for the several Hundreds of Codsheath, Somerden, Westerham and Edenbridge, Wrotham, Brenchley and Horsmonden, Washlingstone, the Lowey of Tonbridge, and the Ville and Liberty of Brasted, in the County of Kent – Codsheath, &c. Court of Requests Act 1808 (48 Geo. 3. c. l)]
- Deal [The Court of Requests in the Town and Borough of Deal – Kent (Small Debts) Act 1786 (26 Geo. 3. c. 18)]
- Derby [Small Debts (Derby) Act 1766 (6 Geo. 3. c. 20)]
- Doncaster [Doncaster Small Debts, Lighting, etc. Act 1763 (4 Geo. 3. c. xl)]
- Dover [The Court of Requests in the Town and Port of Dovor – Kent (Small Debts) Act 1783 (24 Geo. 3. Sess. 1. c. 8)]
- Ecclesall [Court Baron, Sheffield Act 1756 (29 Geo. 2. c. 37); Sheffield and Ecclesall Courts Baron Act 1808 (48 Geo. 3. c. ciii)]
- Elloe [The Court of Requests within the Hundred of Elloe in the County of Lincoln – Elloe, Lincoln (Small Debts) Act 1775 (15 Geo. 3. c. 64); Elloe, Surfleet and Gosberton Court of Requests Act 1807 (47 Geo. 3 Sess. 1. c. xxxvii)]
- Isle of Ely [Isle of Ely Small Debts Act 1778 (18 Geo. 3. c 36)]
- Exeter [Exeter Small Debts Act 1772 (13 Geo. 3. c. 27)]
- Faversham [The Court of Requests in the Town and port of Faversham – Small Debts (Kent) Act 1785 (25 Geo. 3. c. 7)]
- Folkestone [The Court of Requests in the Town and Port of Folkestone – Kent (Small Debts) (No. 3) Act 1786 (26 Geo. 3. c. xcviii)]
- Gloucester [The Gloucester Court of Conscience – Bristol and Gloucester Courts of Conscience Act 1688 (1 Will. & Mar. c. 18 Pr.)]
- Gravesend [Gravesend, &c. Court of Requests Act 1807 (47 Geo. 3 Sess. 2. c. xl)]
- Great Grimsby [The Court of Requests for the Borough of Grimsby, and the Liberties thereof, and the several Parishes and Places in the Hundred or Wapentake of Bradley Haverstoe, and the East Division of the Hundred or Wapenteke of Larborough in the County of Lincoln – Grimsby Court of Requests Act 1806 (46 Geo. 3. c. xxxvii)]
- Hagnaby [Lincolnshire Small Debts Act 1778 (18 Geo. 3. c. 34)]
- Halesowen [The Court of Requests for the Parishes of Hales Owen, Rowley Regis, Tipton, West Bromwich, Harborne, and the Manor of Bradley in the Parish of Wolverhampton, in the several Counties of Worcester, Salop, and Stafford – Halesowen, &c. Court of Requests Act 1807 (47 Geo. 3 Sess. 1. c. xxxvi)]
- Ipswich [Ipswich Court of Requests Act 1807 (47 Geo. 3 Sess. 2. c. lxxix)]
- Kidderminster [Kidderminster (Small Debts) Act 1772 (12 Geo. 3. c. 66)]
- King's Lynn [King's Lynn (Small Debts) Act 1770 (10 Geo. 3. c. 20)]
- Kingston-upon-Hull [The Court of Requests for the Town, Port, and County of the Town of Kingston-upon-Hull – Hull Court of Requests Act 1808 (48 Geo. 3. c. cix)]
- Kirkby in Kendal [Kirby, Westmorland (Small Debts) Act 1764 (4 Geo. 3. c. 41)]
- Lincoln [Small Debts, Lincoln Act 1750 (24 Geo. 2. c. 16)]
- Liverpool [The Court of Requests of the Borough of Liverpool – Liverpool Court of Requests Act 1836 (6 & 7 Will. 4. c. cxxxv])
- Manchester [The Court of Requests for the Parish of Manchester, in the County Palatine of Lancaster – Manchester Court of Requests Act 1808 (48 Geo. 3. c. xliii)]
- Margate [Isle of Thanet Court of Requests Act 1807 (47 Geo. 3 Sess. 2. c. vii)]
- Middlesex [Small Debts, Middlesex Act 1749 (23 Geo. 2. c. 33)]
- Newcastle-upon-Tyne [Newcastle upon Tyne Court of Conscience Act 1688 (1 Will. & Mar. c. 17 Pr.)]
- Norwich [Norwich Court of Requests Act 1700 (12 & 13 Will. 3. c. 7 Pr.)]
- Old Swinford [Old Swineford (Small Debts) Act 1776 (17 Geo. 3. c. 19)]
- Pontefract Honor [The Court Baron of the Honor of Pontefract – Pontefract Small Debts Recovery Act 1839 (2 & 3 Vict. c. lxxxv)]
- Poulton [Lancashire (Small Debts) Act 1770 (10 Geo. 3. c. 21)]
- Rochester [The Court of Requests in the City of Rochester – Rochester, &c. Court of Requests Act 1808 (48 Geo. 3. c. li)]
- Saint Albans [Small Debts, Saint Albans Act 1751 (25 Geo. 2. c. 38)]
- Saint Briavels [The Court of Requests of the Hundred of Saint Briavel's in the County of Gloucester – St. Briavels Small Debts Court Act 1842 (5 & 6 Vict. c. 83)]
- Sandwich [The Court of Requests in the Town and Port of Sandwich, The Court of Requests in the Vill of Ramsgate – Kent (Small Debts) (No. 2) Act 1786 (26 Geo. 3. c. 22); Sandwich and Ramsgate Court of Requests Act 1807 (47 Geo. 3 Sess. 1. c. xxxv)]
- Sheffield [Court Baron, Sheffield Act 1756 (29 Geo. 2. c. 37); Sheffield and Ecclesall Courts Baron Act 1808 (48 Geo. 3. c. ciii)]
- Shrewsbury [Shrewsbury Small Debts Act 1783 (23 Geo. 3. c. 73)]
- Southwark and East Brixton [The Court of Requests in and for the Town and Borough of Southwark and the Eastern Half of the Hundred of Brixton in the County of Surrey – Small Debts, Southwark, etc. Act 1748 (22 Geo. 2. c. 47); Small Debts, Southwark, etc. Act 1758 (32 Geo. 2. c. 6); Southwark Court of Requests Act 1823 (4 Geo. 4. c. cxxiii)]
- Stockport [The Court of Requests for the several Townships of Stockport and Brinnington, and the several Hamlets of Edgeley and Brinksway, in the County Palatine of Chester – Stockport, Brinnington, Edgeley and Brinksway Court of Requests Act 1806 (46 Geo. 3. c. cxiv)]
- Tower Hamlets [The Court of Requests for the Tower Hamlets – Small Debts (Tower Hamlets) Act 1749 (23 Geo. 2. c. 30); Tower Hamlets Court of Requests Act 1832 (2 & 3 Will. 4. c. lxv)]
- Westbury [Westbury, &c. Court of Requests Act 1808 (48 Geo. 3. c. lxxxviii)]
- Westminster [The Court of Requests in and for the City and Liberty of Westminster and that Part of the Duchy of Lancaster which adjoineth thereto – Small Debts, Westminster Act 1749 (23 Geo. 2. c. 27); Small Debts, Westminster Act 1750 (24 Geo. 2. c. 42); ]
- Isle of Wight [The Court of Requests for the Isle of Wight, and several Parishes, Townships, and Places within the same – Isle of Wight Court of Requests Act 1806 (46 Geo. 3. c. lxvi)]
- Wolverhampton [The Court of Request for the Townships of Wolverhampton and Wednesfield and the several Parishes of Brewood, Pattingham, Bushbury and Penn, in the County of Stafford – Wolverhampton Court of Requests Act 1808 (48 Geo. 3. c. cx)]
- Wraggoe [Lincolnshire (Small Debts) Act 1779 (19 Geo. 3. c. 43)]
- Great Yarmouth [Yarmouth Small Debts Act 1757 (31 Geo. 2. c. 24)]
- Aberford [The Barkston-Ash and Skyrack Court of Requests – Aberford Small Debts Recovery Act 1839 (2 & 3 Vict. c. lxxxvi); Barkston-Ash and Skyrack Court of Requests (Yorks.) Act 1840 (3 & 4 Vict. c. xxxiii)]
- Ashby-de-la-Zouch [The Ashby-la-Zouch Court of Requests – Ashby-de-la-Zouch Court of Requests Act 1838 (1 & 2 Vict. c. xv)]
- Barnsley [The Barnsley Upper Court of Requests; The Barnsley Lower Court of Requests – Barnsley Court of Requests Act 1838 (1 & 2 Vict. c. xc)]
- Belper [The Belper Court of Requests – Belper Small Debts Recovery Act 1839 (2 & 3 Vict. c. xcviii)]
- Blackburn [The Blackburn Court of Requests – Blackburn Small Debts Recovery Act 1841 (4 & 5 Vict. c. lxvii)]
- Blackheath [The Court of Requests for the Hundreds of Blackheath, of Bromley and Beckenham, of Rokesley otherwise Ruxley, of Little and Lessness, in the County of Kent, and of Wallington in the County of Surrey – Surrey and Kent Courts of Request Act 1836 (6 & 7 Will. 4. c. cxx); Kent and Surrey Court of Requests Act 1838 (1 & 2 Vict. c. lxxxix)]
- Bolton [The Bolton Court of Requests – Bolton Small Debts Recovery Act 1840 (3 & 4 Vict. c. xviii)]
- Brighton [The Brighton Court of Requests – Brighton and New Shoreham Small Debts Recovery Act 1840 (3 & 4 Vict. c. x)]
- Burnley [The Burnley Court of Requests – Burnley and Colne Small Debts Recovery Act 1841 (4 & 5 Vict. c. lxxxiii)]
- Bury [The Bury Court of Requests – Bury (Lancashire) Small Debts Recovery Act 1839 (2 & 3 Vict. c. ci)]
- Chesterfield [The Chesterfield Court of Requests – Chesterfield Small Debts Recovery Act 1839 (2 & 3 Vict. c. civ)]
- Crediton [Crediton Court of Requests Act 1845 (8 & 9 Vict. c. lxxix)]
- East Retford [The East Retford Court of Requests – East Retford Small Debts Recovery Act 1841 (4 & 5 Vict. c. lxxxvii)]
- Eckington [The Eckington and Dronfield Court of Requests – Eckington Small Debts Recovery Act 1839 (2 & 3 Vict. c. ciii)]
- Exeter [The Exeter Court of Requests – Exeter Small Debts Recovery Act 1841 (4 & 5 Vict. c. lxxiii)]
- Gainsborough [The Gainsburgh Court of Requests – Gainsborough Small Debts Recovery Act 1841 (4 & 5 Vict. c. lxxxvi)]
- Glossop [The Glossop Court of Requests – Glossop Small Debts Recovery Act 1839 (2 & 3 Vict. c. lxxxviii)]
- Grantham [The Grantham Court of Requests – Grantham Small Debts Recovery Act 1839 (2 & 3 Vict. c. lxxxix)]
- Halifax [The Court of Requests for the Parishes of Bradford, Keighley, Bingley, Guiseley, Calverley, Batley, Birstal, Mirfield, Hartishead-cum-Clifton, and the Lordship or Liberty of Tong, in the West Riding of the County of York – Yorkshire Small Debts Recovery Act 1839 (2 & 3 Vict. c. cvi)]
- Hatfield [The Hatfield Court of Requests – (Hatfield (Yorkshire) Small Debts Recovery Act 1839 2 & 3 Vict. c. xcvii); Hatfield Court of Requests Act 1841 (4 & 5 Vict. c. lxxiv)]
- Hinckley [The Court of Requests for Hinckley and other Places in the County of Leicester, and Wolvey, Burton Hastings, and other Places in the County of Warwick – Hinckley Court of Requests Act 1837 (7 Will. 4 & 1 Vict. c. viii)]
- Hyde [The Court of Requests for the several Townships of Hyde, Werneth, Bredbury, Romiley, Marple, Godley, Mottram-in-Longdendale, Hollingworth, and Tintwistle in the County of Chester – Hyde Court of Requests Act 1833 (3 & 4 Will. 4. c. cxix)]
- Kingsnorton [The Kingsnorton Court of Requests – Kingsnorton and Northfield Small Debts Recovery Act 1840 (3 & 4 Vict. c. lxix); Kingsnorton Court of Requests Act 1841 (4 & 5 Vict. c. lxxv)]
- Launceston [The Launceston Court of Requests – Launceston Small Debts Recovery Act 1841 (4 & 5 Vict. c. lxxvi)]
- Leicester [The Court of Requests for the Borough of Leicester – Leicester Court of Requests Act 1836 (6 & 7 Will. 4. c. cxxiii); Leicester Court of Requests Act 1837 (7 Will. 4 & 1 Vict. c. vii)]
- Loughborough [The Loughborough Court of Requests – Loughborough Court of Requests Act 1837 (7 Will. 4 & 1 Vict. c. ix)]
- Newark [The Newark Court of Requests – Newark Small Debts Recovery Act 1839 (2 & 3 Vict. c. xcix); Newark Small Debts Recovery Act 1841 (4 & 5 Vict. c. lxxix)]
- New Sarum [The Salisbury and South Wilts Court of Requests – New Sarum Small Debts Recovery Act 1841 (4 & 5 Vict. c. lxxxiv)]
- New Sleaford [The Sleaford Court of Requests – New Sleaford Small Debts Recovery Act 1841 (4 & 5 Vict. c. lxxxv)]
- Newton Abbott [The Newton Abbot Court of Requests – Newton Abbot Small Debts Recovery Act 1840 (3 & 4 Vict. c. xxv)]
- Nottingham [The Nottingham and Mansfield Court of Requests – Nottingham Small Debts Recovery Act 1839 (2 & 3 Vict. c. cv)]
- Oakham [The Oakham and Uppingham Court of Requests – Oakham and Uppingham Court of Requests Act 1838 (1 & 2 Vict. c. xxxvi)]
- Prestbury Division of the Hundred of Macclesfield [The Court of Requests for the several Townships of Macclesfield, Sutton, Hurdsfield, Tytherington, Bollington, Rainow, Kettleshulme, Macclesfield Forest, Wildboarclough, Mottram Andrew, Pointon, Worth, Woodford, Adlington. Butley-cum-Newton, Prestbury, Bollin Fee, Pownall Fee, Chorley, Fulshaw, Over Alderley, Nether Alderley, Birtles, Capesthorne, Chelford, Eaton, Fallibroome, Gawsworth, Bosley, Henbury, Lyme Handley, Marton, North Rode, Somerford Booths, Siddington, Snelson, Upton, Old Withington, Lower Withington, Wincle, and Great Warford, in the County of Chester – Macclesfield Court of Requests Act 1836 (6 & 7 Will. 4. c. xiii)]
- Prestwich-cum-Oldham [The Oldham Court of Requests – Prestwich-cum-Oldham and Middleton Small Debts Recovery Act 1839 (2 & 3 Vict. c. c)]
- Roborough [Plymouth and Devonport Court of Requests Act 1837 (7 Will. 4 & 1 Vict. c. lxii)]
- Rochdale [The Rochdale Court of Requests – Rochdale Small Debts Recovery Act 1839 (2 & 3 Vict. c. xc)]
- Rotherham [The Rotherham Court of Requests – Rotherham Small Debts Recovery Act 1839 (2 & 3 Vict. c. lxxxvii)]
- Saint Helen's [The Saint Helen's Court of Requests – St. Helens and Prescot Small Debts Recovery Act 1841 (4 & 5 Vict. c. lxxxii)]
- Staffordshire Potteries [The Staffordshire Potteries Court of Requests – Staffordshire Potteries Small Debts Recovery Act 1841 (4 & 5 Vict. c. lxxxi)]
- Tavistock [The Tavistock Court of Requests – Tavistock Small Debts Recovery Act 1840 (3 & 4 Vict. c. lxviii)]
- Totnes [The Totnes Court of Requests – Totnes Small Debts Recovery Act 1841 (4 & 5 Vict. c lxxx)]
- Warrington [The Warrington Court of Requests – Warrington Small Debts Recovery Act 1839 (2 & 3 Vict. c. xci)]
- Westminster [The Court of Requests for the City and Liberty of Westminster and that Part of the Duchy of Lancaster which adjoineth thereto – Westminster Court of Requests Act 1836 (6 & 7 Will. 4. c. cxxxvii)]
- Wigan [The Wigan, Chorley, and Ormskirk Court of Requests – Wigan, Chorley and Ormskirk Small Debts Recovery Act 1841 (4 & 5 Vict. c. lxxviii)]
- Wirksworth [The Wirksworth Court of Requests – Wirksworth Small Debts Recovery Act 1839 (2 & 3 Vict. c. cii)]

== See also ==
- List of Masters of Requests – Chronological list of Masters of Requests
- Court of equity

== Bibliography ==
- Alexander, Michael (1981). The first of the Tudors: a study of Henry VII and his reign. Taylor & Francis. ISBN 0-7099-0503-3.
- Carter, Albert Thomas (1902). A History of English Legal Institutions (2nd ed.). London: Butterworth. OCLC 315400838.
- Kleineke, Hannes (2007). "Richard III and the Origins of the Court of Requests". The Ricardian. Vol. XVII.
- Leadam, Isaac Saunders (1898). Selected Cases in the Court of Requests A.D. 1497-1569. Publications of the Selden Society, Volume XII. London: Bernard Quaritch.
- Pollard, Albert Fredrick (1941). "The Growth of the Court of Requests". The English Historical Review. 56 (222). Oxford University Press: 300–303. doi:10.1093/ehr/lvi.ccxxii.300. ISSN 0013-8266.
- Spence, George (1846). The Equitable Jurisdiction of the Court of Chancery. Volume 1. London: V. and R. Stevens and G. S. Norton.
