= County Court (England and Wales) =

National civil court for England and Wales

The County Court is a national civil court for England and Wales with unlimited financial jurisdiction.

The County Court sits in various County Court buildings and courtrooms throughout England and Wales, and not in one single location. It is a single court in the sense of a single centrally organised and administered court system. The County Court centres in which the court sits today correspond to the earlier individual county courts.

== History ==
The first mention of what was to become a court was the concept of a Comitatus in the time of the early Germans. According to the writings of the Roman historian Tacitus's treatise Germania (AD 98), the comitatus was a military bond between a Germanic warrior and his Lord. Later, during the Anglo-Saxon period (450–1066) the Comitatus was a court of law and not an organisation for military purposes.

In Anglo-Saxon England, the name for court was gemot and all courts were called by this name. Later, the shire court was an early form of representative democracy. After the Norman conquest of England in 1066, there was further development of county courts and government. All of England was divided into administrative units called shires, with subdivisions. Shires were run by officials known as shire reeves or sheriffs.

The chief business of the court was to hear civil pleas. There were numerous separate county court systems, each with jurisdiction across England and Wales for enforcement of its orders, but each with a defined "county court district" from which it took claims. County court districts did not always have the same boundaries as counties.

County Courts Act 1846 (Note: Section 34 of the County Courts Act 1867 (30 & 31 Vict. c. 142).)
- Act of Parliament
- Parliament of the United Kingdom
- Long title: An Act for the more easy Recovery of Small Debts and Demands in England.
- Citation: 9 & 10 Vict. c. 95
- Territorial extent: United Kingdom

Dates
- Royal assent: 28 August 1846
- Commencement: 28 August 1846 (Note: The Acts of Parliament (Commencement) Act 1793.)
- Repealed: 1 January 1889
Other legislation
Amends	St. Briavels Small Debts Court Act 1842
Repeals/revokes	Small Debts (Tower Hamlets) Act 1749; Small Debts, Middlesex Act 1749; Small Debts, Lincoln Act 1750; Small Debts, Birmingham Act 1751; Small Debts, Saint Albans Act 1751; Courts Baron of High Peak and Castleton Act 1759; Small Debts (Tower Hamlets) Act 1779; Westminster Court of Requests Act 1836
Amended by	Bankruptcy Repeal and Insolvent Court Act 1869; Statute Law Revision Act 1875; Summary Jurisdiction Act 1884
Repealed by	County Courts Act 1888

Status: Repealed

Text of statute as originally enacted

County Courts Act 1867 (Note: Section 34.)
- Act of Parliament
- Parliament of the United Kingdom
- Long title: An Act to amend the Acts relating to the Jurisdiction of the County Courts.
- Citation: 30 & 31 Vict. c. 142
- Territorial extent: United Kingdom

Dates
- Royal assent: 5 July 1865
- Commencement: 1 January 1866 (Note: Section 36.)
- Repealed: 1 January 1889
Other legislation
Amended by	Statute Law Revision Act 1875
Repealed by	County Courts Act 1888

Status: Repealed

Text of statute as originally enacted

The modern County Court in England and Wales was created by the County Courts Act 1846 (9 & 10 Vict. c. 95), which created a jurisdiction for small civil claims intended to be more coherent, and less cumbersome and costly, than the universal jurisdiction of the High Court or the remnants of local courts administering justice in civil matters. While older local courts were, for the most part, left in place to start with, their days were numbered and section 28 of the County Courts Act 1867 (30 & 31 Vict. c. 142) gave the new court system exclusive jurisdiction over other inferior courts (i.e. other than the High Court) for most purposes. The County Courts Act 1888 (51 & 52 Vict.) c. 43 further consolidated the law governing the court.

Further reorganisation was achieved by the Courts Act 1971, which abolished the title of county court judge and redesignated existing holders of the office as circuit judges. Since 2014, England and Wales have had what is officially described as "a single civil court" named the County Court, with unlimited financial jurisdiction.

== Procedure ==
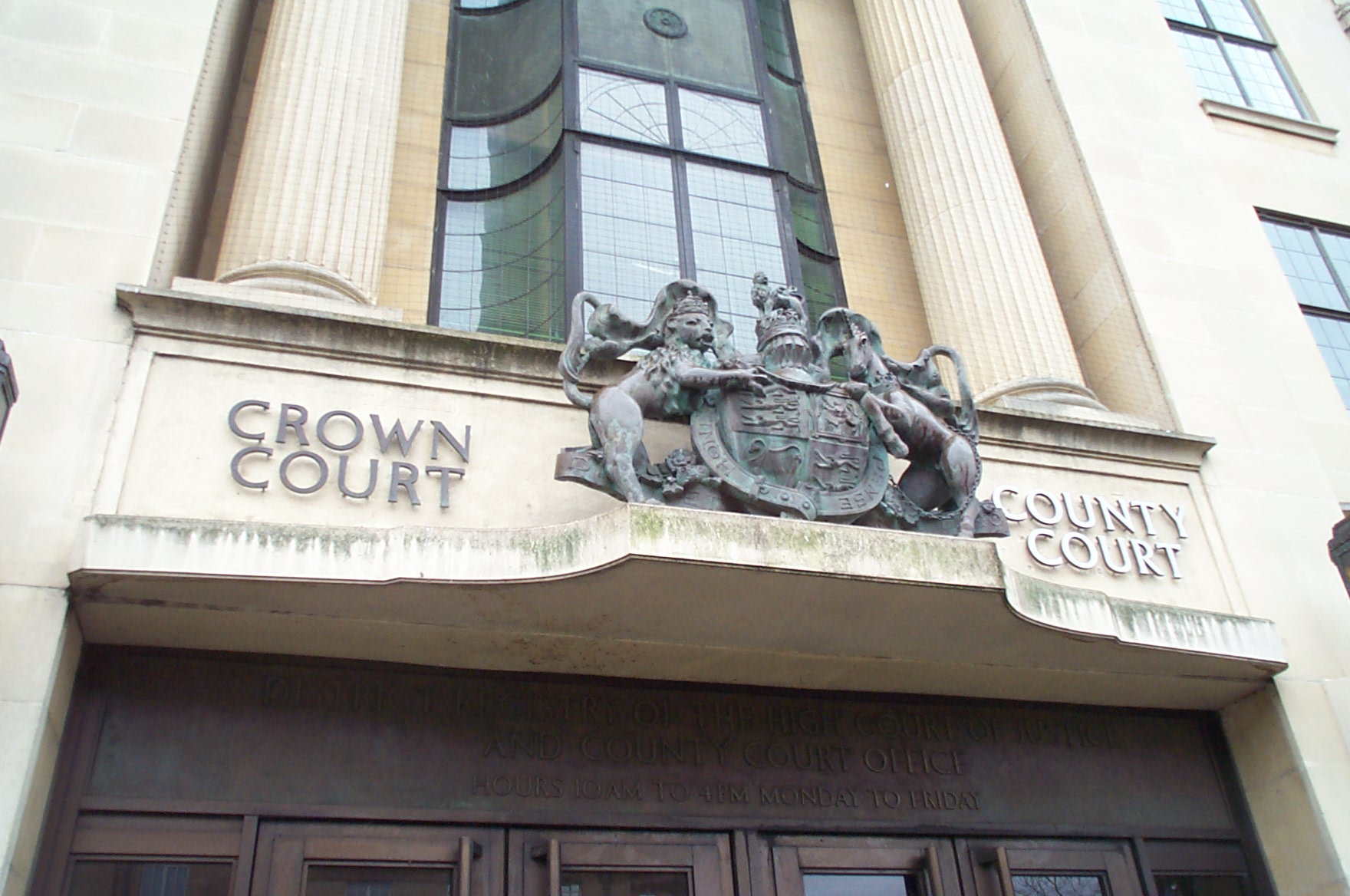
Court building in Oxford used by the Crown Court and County Court.

County Court matters can be lodged at a court in person, by post or via the Internet in some cases through the County Court Bulk Centre. Cases are normally heard at the court having jurisdiction over the area where the claimant lives. Most matters are decided by a district judge or circuit judge sitting alone. Civil matters in England (with minor exceptions, e.g. in some actions against the police) do not have juries. Judges in the County Court are either former barristers or former solicitors, whereas in the High Court they are more likely to have formerly been a barrister.

== Small claims ==
Civil claims with an amount in controversy under £10,000 (the Jackson Reforms have increased this from £5,000) are dealt with in the County Court under the small claims track (sometimes known to the public as "small claims court," although it is not a separate court). Claims between £5,000 and £25,000 (£15,000 for cases started before April 2009) that are capable of being tried within one day are allocated to the "fast track" and claims over £25,000 (£15,000 for cases started before April 2009) to the "multi track." These 'tracks' are labels for the use of the court system – the actual cases will be heard in the County Court or the High Court depending on their value. For personal injury, defamation, and some landlord-tenant dispute cases the thresholds for each track have different values.

== Appeals ==
Appeals are to a higher judge (a circuit judge hears appeals from a district judge). From the decision of a circuit judge an appeal lies to either the High Court of Justice or to the Court of Appeal.

== Enforcement ==
In debt cases, the aim of a claimant taking County Court action against a defendant is to secure a County Court judgment. This is a legal order to pay the full amount of the debt. Judgments can be enforced at the request of the claimant in a number of ways, including requesting the court bailiffs to seize goods, the proceeds of any sale being used to pay the debt, or an Attachment of Earnings Order, where the defendant's employer is ordered to make deductions from the gross wages to pay the claimant.

County Court judgments are recorded in the Register of Judgments, Orders and Fines and in the defendant's credit records held by credit reference agencies. This information is used in consumer credit scores, making it difficult or more expensive for the defendant to obtain credit. In order to avoid the record being kept for years in the register, the debt must be settled within thirty days after the date the County Court judgment was served (unless the judgment was later set aside). If the debt was not fully paid within the statutory period, the entry will remain for six full years.
