= List of acts of the Parliament of England from 1700 =

This is a list of acts of the Parliament of England for the year 1700.

For acts passed during the period 1707–1800, see the list of acts of the Parliament of Great Britain. See also the list of acts of the Parliament of Scotland, and the list of acts of the Parliament of Ireland.

For acts passed from 1801 onwards, see the list of acts of the Parliament of the United Kingdom. For acts of the devolved parliaments and assemblies in the United Kingdom, see the list of acts of the Scottish Parliament, the list of acts of the Northern Ireland Assembly, and the list of acts and measures of Senedd Cymru; see also the list of acts of the Parliament of Northern Ireland.

For medieval statutes, etc. that are not considered to be acts of Parliament, see the list of English statutes.

See also the List of ordinances and acts of the Parliament of England, 1642–1660 for ordinances and acts passed by the Long Parliament and other bodies without royal assent, and which were not considered to be valid legislation following the Restoration in 1660.

The number shown after each act's title is its chapter number. Acts are cited using this number, preceded by the years of the reign during which the relevant parliamentary session was held; thus the Union with Ireland Act 1800 is cited as "39 & 40 Geo. 3. c. 67", meaning the 67th act passed during the session that started in the 39th year of the reign of George III and which finished in the 40th year of that reign. The modern convention is to use Arabic numerals in citations (thus "41 Geo. 3" rather than "41 Geo. III"). Acts of the last session of the Parliament of Great Britain and the first session of the Parliament of the United Kingdom are both cited as "41 Geo. 3".

Acts passed by the Parliament of England did not have a short title; however, some of these acts have subsequently been given a short title by acts of the Parliament of the United Kingdom, such as the Short Titles Act 1896 (59 & 60 Vict. c. 14).

Acts passed by the Parliament of England were deemed to have come into effect on the first day of the session in which they were passed. Because of this, the years given in the list below may in fact be the year before a particular act was passed.

== 12 & 13 Will. 3 ==
The 5th Parliament of William III which met from 6 February 1701 until 11 November 1701.

This session was also traditionally cited as 12 & 13 Gul. 3, 12 & 13 W. 3, 12 Will. 3, 12 Gul. 3 or 12 W. 3.

=== Public acts ===
Short title	Citation	Royal assent
Long title
Exchequer Bills Act 1700 (repealed)	12 & 13 Will. 3. c. 1	13 March 1701
An Act for renewing the bills of credit, commonly called, Exchequer bills. (Repealed by Statute Law Revision Act 1867 (30 & 31 Vict. c. 59))
Act of Settlement or the Act of Settlement 1700 or the Act of Settlement 1701	12 & 13 Will. 3. c. 2	12 June 1701
An Act for the further Limitation of the Crown and better securing the Rights and Liberties of the Subject.
Privilege of Parliament Act 1700 (repealed)	12 & 13 Will. 3. c. 3	12 June 1701
An Act for preventing any Inconveniencies that may happen by Priviledge of Parliament. (Repealed by Statute Law Revision Act 1867 (30 & 31 Vict. c. 59))
Plate Assay Act 1700 (repealed)	12 & 13 Will. 3. c. 4	12 June 1701
An Act for appointing Wardens and Assay Masters for assaying Wrought Plate in the Cities of York, Exeter, Bristol, Chester, and Norwich. (Repealed by Assay Offices Act 1962 (10 & 11 Eliz. 2. c. xvii))
Returns to Parliament Act 1700 (repealed)	12 & 13 Will. 3. c. 5	12 June 1701
An Act for continuing a former Act (Note: Parliamentary Elections (Returns) Act 1695 (7 & 8 Will. 3. c. 7)) to prevent false and Double Returns of Members to serve in Parliament. (Repealed by Statute Law Revision Act 1867 (30 & 31 Vict. c. 59))
Moss Troopers Act 1700 (repealed)	12 & 13 Will. 3. c. 6	12 June 1701
An Act for continuing the Acts therein mentioned, for preventing Theft and Rapine upon the Northern Borders of England. (Repealed by Statute Law Revision Act 1867 (30 & 31 Vict. c. 59))
British Museum Act 1700 (repealed)	12 & 13 Will. 3. c. 7	12 June 1701
An Act for the better Settling and Preserving the Library kept in the House at Westminster, called Cotton-house, in the Name and Family of the Cottons, for the Benefit of the Publick. (Repealed by Statute Law Revision Act 1948 (11 & 12 Geo. 6. c. 62))
Militia Act 1700 (repealed)	12 & 13 Will. 3. c. 8	12 June 1701
An Act for raising the militia for one year, although the month's pay formerly advanced be not repaid. (Repealed by Statute Law Revision Act 1867 (30 & 31 Vict. c. 59))
Minehead Harbour Act 1700 (repealed)	12 & 13 Will. 3. c. 9	12 June 1701
An Act for recovering, securing, and keeping in repair the harbour of Minehead, for the benefit and support of the navigation and trade of this kingdom. (Repealed by Minehead Pier and Harbour Act 1823 (4 Geo. 4. c. cxiii))
Taxation of Members of Parliament Act 1700 (repealed)	12 & 13 Will. 3. c. 10	24 June 1701
An Act for granting an aid to his Majesty for defraying the expence of his navy, guards, and garrisons for one year, and for other necessary occasions. (Repealed by House of Commons Disqualification Act 1957 (5 & 6 Eliz. 2. c. 20))
Taxation Act 1700 (repealed)	12 & 13 Will. 3. c. 11	24 June 1701
An Act for granting to his Majesty several duties upon low wines or spirits of the first extraction, and continuing several additional duties upon coffee, tea, chocolate, spices and pictures, and certain impositions upon hawkers, pedlars, and petty chapmen, and the duty of fifteen per centum upon muslins, and for improving the duties upon japanned and lacquered goods, and for continuing the coinage duty, and the several terms and purposes therein mentioned. (Repealed by Statute Law Revision Act 1867 (30 & 31 Vict. c. 59))
Appropriation of Revenue Act 1700 (repealed)	12 & 13 Will. 3. c. 12	24 June 1701
An Act for appropriating three thousand seven hundred pounds weekly, out of certain branches of excise, for publick uses, and for making a provision for the service of his Majesty's houshold and family, and other his necessary occasions. (Repealed by Statute Law Revision Act 1867 (30 & 31 Vict. c. 59))
Duchy of Cornwall Act 1700 (repealed)	12 & 13 Will. 3. c. 13	24 June 1701
An Act to enable his Majesty to make leases and copies of offices, lands and hereditaments, parcel of his Duchy of Cornwall, or annexed to the same; and for confirmation of leases already made. (Repealed by Statute Law Revision Act 1948 (11 & 12 Geo. 6. c. 62))

=== Private acts ===
Short title	Citation	Royal assent
Long title
Duke of Ormond's Estate Act 1700	12 & 13 Will. 3. c. 1 Pr.	12 June 1701
An Act for the more speedy Payment of the Creditors of James late Duke of Ormonde, and of the present Duke of Ormonde.
Viscountess Bulkeley's Estate Act 1700	12 & 13 Will. 3. c. 2 Pr.	12 June 1701
An Act to enable the Right Honourable Elizabeth Viscountess Bulkley, of Cashells, in the Kingdom of Ireland, to sell certain Lands, in the County of Devon, and City and County of the City of Exon, for the Payment of Debts.
Viscount Kilmorey's Estate Act 1700	12 & 13 Will. 3. c. 3 Pr.	12 June 1701
An Act to enable Robert Lord Viscount Kilmorey, of the Kingdom of Ireland, (being an Infant) to settle divers Manors, Lands, and Hereditaments, in the Kingdom of England, upon a Treaty of Marriage.
Barrington's Estate Act 1700	12 & 13 Will. 3. c. 4 Pr.	12 June 1701
An Act to enable Sir Charles Barrington Baronet to settle a Jointure, and make Provision for his Younger Children.
Marsham's Estate Act 1700	12 & 13 Will. 3. c. 5 Pr.	12 June 1701
An Act to enable Sir Robert Marsham Knight and Baronet to dispose of Lands in Hertfordshire; and to settle other Lands, of better Value, in Kent, to the same Uses as the Lands in Hertfordshire are settled.
King's Lynn Hospitals and Workhouses Act 1700 (repealed)	12 & 13 Will. 3. c. 6 Pr.	12 June 1701
An Act for erecting Hospitals and Workhouses within the Borough of King's Lynn, in the County of Norfolke, for the better employing and maintaining the Poor there. (Repealed by Local Government Board's Provisional Orders Confirmation (Cumberworth, &c.) Act 1876 (39 & 40 Vict. c. xiv))
Norwich Court of Requests Act 1700	12 & 13 Will. 3. c. 7 Pr.	12 June 1701
An Act for erecting a Court of Request, or Conscience, in the City and County of the City of Norwich, for the Recovery of small Debts under Forty Shillings.
Jermyn's Estate Act 1700	12 & 13 Will. 3. c. 8 Pr.	12 June 1701
An Act to enable Stephen Jermyn to make Provision for his Younger Children, and for the Advancement of his Eldest Son.
Norfolk: sale of manors and lands in South Pickenham and elsewhere, and purchase and settlement of others to the same uses.	12 & 13 Will. 3. c. 9 Pr.	12 June 1701
An Act for the vesting and settling certain Manors and Lands in South Pickenham, and other Places in the County of Norfolke, in Trustees, to be sold; and for laying out the Monies arising by Sale thereof in the Purchase of other Lands, to be settled to such and the same Uses as the said Manors and Lands so to be vested are and stand settled.
Trevisia's Estate Act 1700	12 & 13 Will. 3. c. 10 Pr.	12 June 1701
An Act for discharging a Mortgage upon the Estate of Peter Trevisa Esquire deceased, and providing a Maintenance for his Widow and Children.
Faster payment of Christopher Killiow's debts and raising portions and maintenance for his siblings in pursuance of his father's will.	12 & 13 Will. 3. c. 11 Pr.	12 June 1701
An Act for the more speedy Payment of the Debts of Christopher Killiow Esquire; and for the raising Portions and Maintenance for his Brothers and Sisters, in Pursuance of his Father's Will.
Hide's Estates Act 1700	12 & 13 Will. 3. c. 12 Pr.	12 June 1701
An Act for vesting the Estate of Humphry Hyde Esquire deceased, in Trustees, for raising Portions for his Younger Children.
Furnishing the town of New Deal with fresh water.	12 & 13 Will. 3. c. 13 Pr.	12 June 1701
An Act for furnishing the Town of New Deale with fresh Water.
Nodes' Estate Act 1700	12 & 13 Will. 3. c. 14 Pr.	12 June 1701
An Act for vesting a Messuage and Lands in Stevenage, in the County of Hertford, the Estate of Richard Nodes, in Trustees, to be sold, for making a Provision for his Wife and Children, equal to the Provision secured to them out of the said Estate.
Davison's Estate Act 1700	12 & 13 Will. 3. c. 15 Pr.	12 June 1701
An Act for Sale of the Estate of William Davison Esquire deceased, for Payment of Debts, and raising his Childrens Portions charged thereupon.
Earl of Anglesea's Separation Act 1700	12 & 13 Will. 3. c. 16 Pr.	12 June 1701
An Act for separating James Earl of Anglesey from Katherine Countess of Anglesey his Wife, for the Cruelty of the said Earl.
Dillon's Divorce Act 1700	12 & 13 Will. 3. c. 17 Pr.	12 June 1701
An Act for dissolving the Marriage of Sir John Dillon with Mary Boyle; and for other Purposes therein mentioned.
Box's Divorce Act 1700	12 & 13 Will. 3. c. 18 Pr.	12 June 1701
An Act to dissolve the Marriage of Ralph Box with Elizabeth Eyre; and to enable him to marry again.
Fawconer's Estate Act 1700	12 & 13 Will. 3. c. 19 Pr.	12 June 1701
An Act for the vesting several Messuages, Lands, and Tenements, belonging to John Fawconer Esquire, in Trustees, to be sold, for Payment of Debts.
New trustees for City of London's trust lands.	12 & 13 Will. 3. c. 20 Pr.	12 June 1701
An Act for transferring a Trust in Lands, belonging to the City of London, unto new Trustees.
Hertford County Gaol Act 1700 (repealed)	12 & 13 Will. 3. c. 21 Pr.	12 June 1701
An Act for removing the County Gaol of Hertford. (Repealed by Statute Law (Repeals) Act 2008 (c. 12))
Apsley's Estate Act 1700	12 & 13 Will. 3. c. 22 Pr.	12 June 1701
An Act for the better Performance of the last Will of Henry Apsley Esquire deceased.
Bennet's Estate Act 1700	12 & 13 Will. 3. c. 23 Pr.	12 June 1701
An Act for vesting the Estate of Thomas Bennet, late of Newton cum Larton, in the County of Chester, in Trustees, for the Use of the Poor of West Kirby, pursuant to the Will of the said Thomas Bennet.
Enabling William Vaughan and Frances Vaughan his intended wife, both infants, to perform marriage articles.	12 & 13 Will. 3. c. 24 Pr.	12 June 1701
An Act to enable William Vaughan Esquire and Frances Vaughan his intended Wife (being both under the Age of One and Twenty Years) to perform Articles made for their Marriage.
Change of Ellis Mew's surname to the surname St. John.	12 & 13 Will. 3. c. 25 Pr.	12 June 1701
An Act to change the Surname of Ellis Mews and his Heirs to the Surname of St. John.
Declaring the authenticity of Sir Joseph Herne's will.	12 & 13 Will. 3. c. 27 Pr.	12 June 1701
An Act for declaring the Will of Sir Joseph Herne Knight, dated the Five and Twentieth Day of February One Thousand Six Hundred Ninety-eight, to be taken and esteemed the last Will of the said Sir Joseph Herne.
Making good the deficiency of the charges of making a way out of Chancery Lane into Lincoln's Inn Fields	12 & 13 Will. 3. c. 26 Pr.	12 June 1701
An Act for making good the Deficiency of the Charges of making a Way out of Chancery Lane into Lincolne's Inn Fields. (Note: 11 Will. 3. c. 11 Pr.)
Naturalization of Jane Barkstead and vesting several mortgages and securities in her.	12 & 13 Will. 3. c. 28 Pr.	12 June 1701
An Act for naturalizing Jane Barkstead Widow; and vesting several Mortgages and Securities in her, to enable her to convey or assign the same.
Naturalization of Archibald Arthur and enabling him to dispose of his estate.	12 & 13 Will. 3. c. 29 Pr.	12 June 1701
An Act for naturalizing Archibald Arthur, and enabling him to dispose of his Estate.
Naturalization of Jacob Auguste Pynyot and others.	12 & 13 Will. 3. c. 30 Pr.	12 June 1701
An Act for naturalizing Jacob Auguste Pyniot and others.
Naturalization of Adrian Loftland and others.	12 & 13 Will. 3. c. 31 Pr.	12 June 1701
An Act for naturalizing Adrian Lofland and others.
Enabling Sir Thomas Stanley to charge manors and lands in Lancashire with £300 for payment of his sisters' portions and his debts.	12 & 13 Will. 3. c. 32 Pr.	24 June 1701
An Act to enable Sir Thomas Stanley Baronet to charge certain Manors, and Lands, in the County of Lancaster, with Three Thousand Pounds, for Payment of his Sisters Portions and his Debts.
Deane's Estate Act 1700	12 & 13 Will. 3. c. 33 Pr.	24 June 1701
An Act for Sale of the Estate of James Deane; and for securing the Monies raised thereby, for the Benefit of himself and Family, according to the Settlement thereof.
Bigg's Estate Act 1700	12 & 13 Will. 3. c. 34 Pr.	24 June 1701
An Act to enable Richard Bigg to charge Part of his Estate, in the Counties of Hertford and Bedford, with the Payment of his Debts.
Naturalization of Peter Bagneol, Daniel Senault and others.	12 & 13 Will. 3. c. 35 Pr.	24 June 1701
An Act for naturalizing Peter Bagneol, Daniel Senault, and others.
Naturalization of Gaspar Cordoso, Herman Vant Wedde and others.	12 & 13 Will. 3. c. 36 Pr.	24 June 1701
An Act for naturalizing Gasper Cordoso, Herman Van't-Wedde, and others.

=== Sources ===
- Raithby, John, ed. (1963) [1820]. "12° & 13° Gul. III.". Statutes of the Realm. Vol. 7: The Statutes of King William III (1695–1701). London: Dawsons. pp. 635–730 – via HathiTrust.
- Raithby, John, ed. (1820). Statutes of the Realm. Vol. 7: 1696-1701 – via British History Online.
- Pickering, Danby, ed. (1764). "Anno dudecimo & decimo tertio Gulielmi III". The Statutes at Large. Vol. 10: From the Eighth Year of King William III to the Second Year of Queen Anne. Cambridge: Joseph Bentham. pp. 355–397 – via Internet Archive.
- Journals of the House of Commons. Vol. 13. London: His Majesty's Stationery Office. 1803. pp. 324–641 – via Google Books.
- Journal of the House of Lords. Vol. 16: 1696-1701. London: His Majesty's Stationery Office. 1830. pp. 590–776 – via British History Online.
- Chronological Table of and Index to the Statutes. Vol. 1: To the End of the Session 59 Vict. Sess. 2 (1895) (13th ed.). London: Her Majesty's Stationery Office. 1896. p. 82 – via Google Books.
- Chronological Table of the Statutes: Covering the Period from 1235 to the End of 1971. London: Her Majesty's Stationery Office. 1972. p. 79. ISBN 978-0-11-840096-1 – via Google Books.
- "Acts of the English Parliament from 1700". legislation.gov.uk. The National Archives.
- "Chronological Tables of the Private and Personal Acts: Part 5 (1695–1701)". legislation.gov.uk. The National Archives.

== See also ==
- List of acts of the Parliament of England
