= Isleworth Hundred =

Historical division of Middlesex, England

Coordinates: 51.47°N 0.35°W

Location of Isleworth Hundred within Middlesex

Isleworth Hundred was a subdivision of the historic county of Middlesex, England. In Domesday Book (1086) it was recorded as Hundeslaw Hundred ("Hounslow Hundred" in modern spelling).

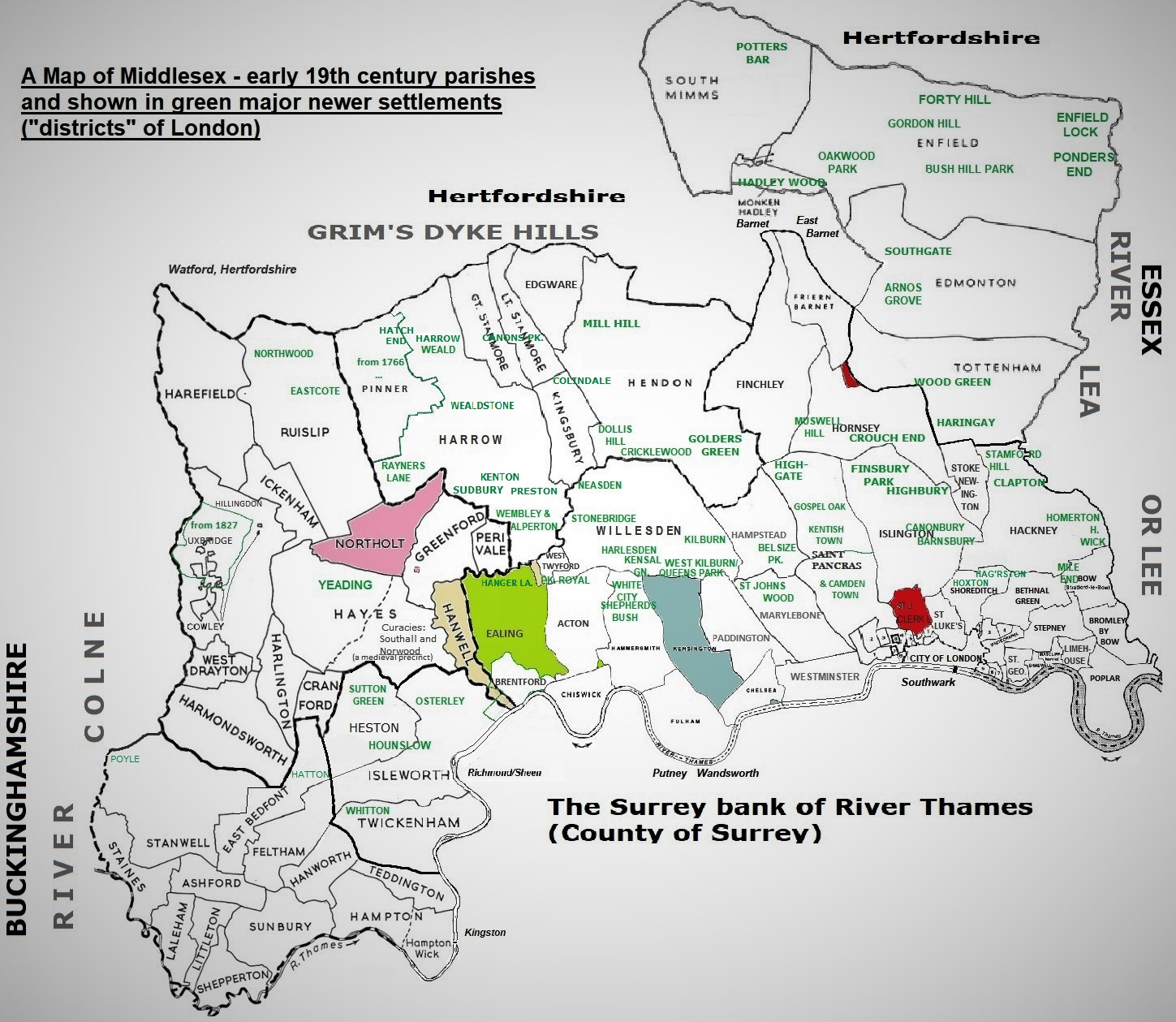
The parishes and major newer settlements in the Hundred.

It contained three parishes, whose acreage and square miles area is given as at the 1870s-1880s:

Heston	3720 acres	= 15.1 square kilometres (5.8 sq mi)
Isleworth	3143 acres	= 12.7 square kilometres (4.9 sq mi)
Twickenham	2249 acres	= 9.1 square kilometres (3.5 sq mi)

In 1801 Middlesex measured 734 km². This, the smallest of the county's six hundreds, amounted to 5% of that area.

The hundred's name means 'enclosure of Gislhere'.

All of the above area in earliest records was exceptionally part of one manor, that of Isleworth based at Syon Abbey. The ownership separated in the middle of the medieval centuries; that of Heston was inherited from marriage of the daughter of Francis Child by the Earl of Jersey (with the Childs-Villier and later Villier surname) until the 20th century seated at the house built by Child employing Robert Adam, Osterley House in the north-east of Isleworth parish. The others two main manors fell into the hands of the Duke of Northumberland (with the surname Percy) who took over the abbey's demesne and built Syon House in the east of in Isleworth. The Domesday Book of 1086 names the unit (in its heavily abbreviated fusion of Latin and French) Hounslow Hundred, a term never found again. Hampton to the south-west was stated to be under Hounslow Hundred Court at that date. In the many Feet of Fines, Assize Rolls, subsidy rolls and other central government and manorial court documents, save for a similar reference to Isleworth Hundred in a charter of the 12th century, Hampton is listed as unequivocally part of Spelthorne Hundred. This is explained by the abbey's and then the Percy family's holdings there.

Further named clusters of buildings (sometimes termed hamlets) emerged during its relevant currency:

- Hounslow which was from the 16th century straddled the divide between the first-two named parishes.
- Whitton in the parish of Twickenham
- North Hyde in the parish of Heston
- Sutton in the parish of Heston
- Lampton in the parish of Heston
- Worton in the parish of Isleworth
- Wyke in the parish of Isleworth
- Scrattage (now part of Osterley) in the parish of Heston

== See also ==
Other Middlesex hundreds:

- Elthorne
- Spelthorne
- Gore
- Ossulston or Ossulstone
- Edmonton
