= City of London Court of Requests Act 1835 =

Act of the Parliament of the United Kingdom

- Act of Parliament
- Parliament of the United Kingdom
- Long title: An Act for amending and consolidating the Acts of Parliament for the Recovery of Small Debts in the City of London and the Liberties thereof, and for enabling the Goods of the Debtors to be taken in Execution.
- Citation: 5 & 6 Will. 4. c. xciv
- Territorial extent: United Kingdom

Dates
- Royal assent: 21 August 1835
- Commencement: 30 September 1835 (Note: Section 65.)
- Repealed: 29 September 1847

Other legislation
- Amends: See § Repealed enactments
- Repeals/revokes: See § Repealed enactments
- Repealed by: London (City) Small Debts Act 1847

Status: Repealed

Text of statute as originally enacted

The City of London Court of Requests Act 1835 (5 & 6 Will. 4. c. xciv), also known as the City of London (Small Debts) Act 1835, was a local act of the Parliament of the United Kingdom that consolidated enactments relating to the recovery of small debts in the City of London and the liberties thereof.

== Background ==
Before the act was passed, the Lord Mayor and aldermen of the City of London, acting under various acts of the Common Council, had been accustomed to appoint two aldermen and twelve discreet commoners monthly to sit as commissioners of the Court of Requests in the Guildhall, to hear and determine debts not exceeding forty shillings. The jurisdiction and procedure of the court had subsequently been regulated by four acts of Parliament, passed in 1603, 1605, 1741 and 1800.

== Provisions ==
=== Repealed enactments ===
Section 1 of the act repealed 4 enactments, listed in that section.

Citation	Short title	Extent of repeal
1 Jas. 1. c. 14	City of London Court of Conscience Act 1603	The whole act.
3 Jas. 1. c. 15	City of London Court of Conscience Act 1605	The whole act.
14 Geo. 2. c. 10	City of London Court of Requests Act 1741	The whole act.
39 & 40 Geo. 3. c. 104	City of London Court of Requests Act 1800	The whole act.

Section 2 of the act repealed part of a fifth enactment, listed in that section.

Citation	Short title	Extent of repeal
25 Geo. 3. c. 45	Courts of Conscience Act 1785	So far as it related to the Court of Requests of the City of London and the liberties thereof, and the debtors committed therefrom.

=== Commissioners and rotation ===
Section 4 of the act provided that two aldermen of the City, together with not fewer than twenty inhabitant householders of the respective wards, including the common councilmen for the time being, were to be nominated and appointed as commissioners of the Court of Requests, sitting for one calendar month at a time in rotation through the wards of the City.

=== Commencement and duration ===
Section 65 of the act provided that it was to commence and take effect from 30 September 1835. Section 66 provided that the local jurisdiction conferred on the commissioners would cease six calendar months after the passing of any general act for the recovery of small debts extending to the City and its liberties. Section 67 declared the act to be a public act, to be judicially noticed as such.

== Subsequent developments ==
The jurisdiction of the Court of Requests was transferred to the Sheriffs' Court of the City of London in 1847. The whole act was repealed by section 5 of the London (City) Small Debts Act 1847 (10 & 11 Vict. c. lxxi), which came into force on 29 September 1847.
