= 5th Parliament of William III =

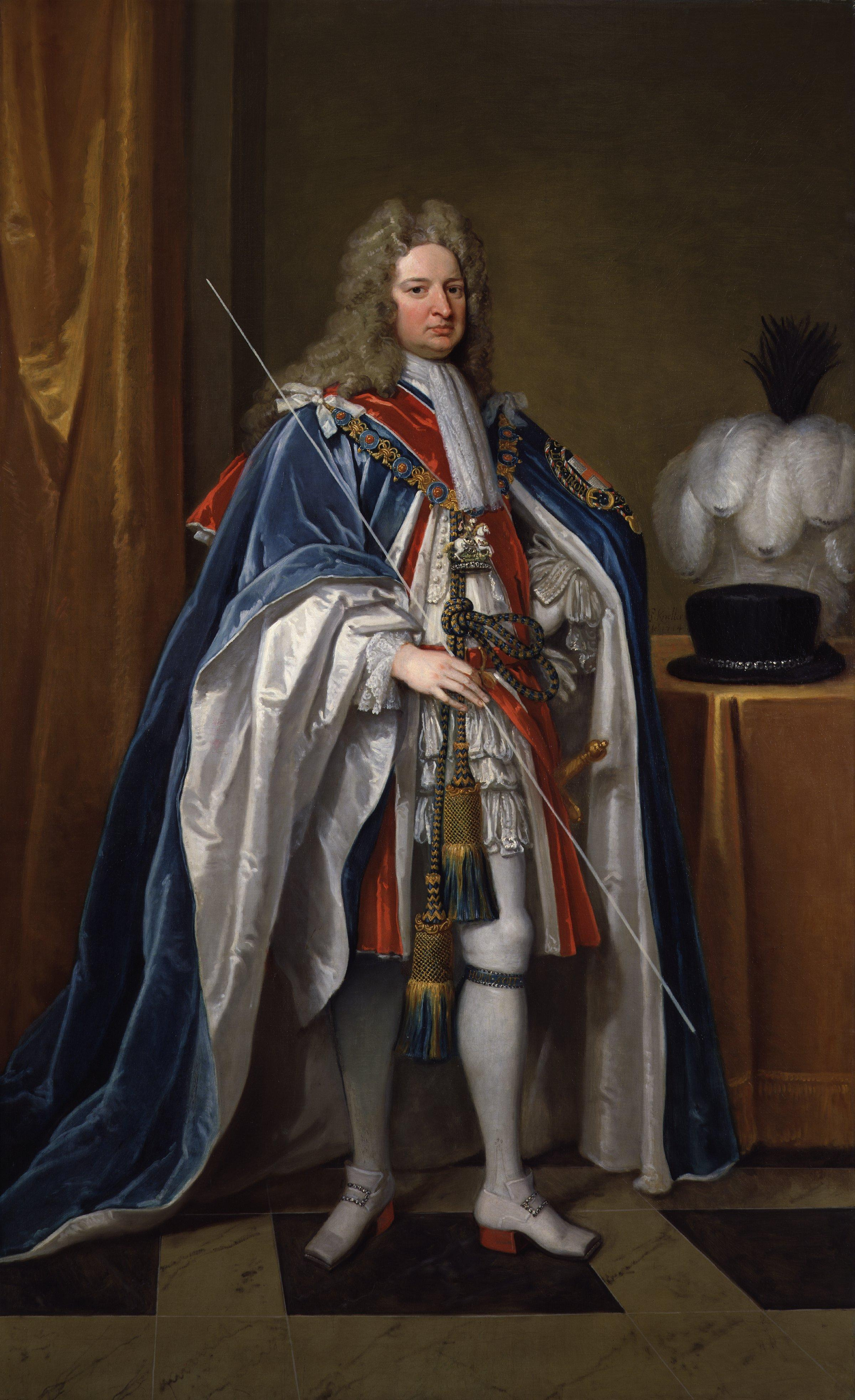
Robert Harley, Speaker

The 5th Parliament of William III was summoned by William III of England on 26 December 1700 and assembled on 6 February 1701. The party political constitution of the new House of Commons was 249 Tories, 219 Whigs and 45 others, representing a significant swing in favour of the Tories. Robert Harley, the Tory member for Radnor, who had declined a post in William III's new ministry, was elected Speaker of the House.

== Succession dispute and invitation to the House of Hanover to accept the throne ==
The two main issues facing the new Parliament were clear. One was the issue of the succession, following the death of Prince William, Duke of Gloucester, Princess Anne's only surviving child, in July 1700 and the other was the threat of war with France. A ‘bill of settlement’, which would invite the Protestant House of Hanover to accept the English throne was piloted through both Houses, albeit on terms which would further restrict royal prerogative, by 22 May 1701.

== Dispute over the succession of Charles II of Spain ==
Initially Parliament was of one accord as far as the ratification of the second Partition Treaty, which was an agreement between Britain and other powers to decide the division of the Spanish kingdom and Empire upon the death on 1 November 1700 of the imbecilic Charles II of Spain without heirs. When Parliament discovered that the King's emissary Lord Portland had already concluded the treaty without their knowledge or approval he was impeached, followed by Junto members Charles Montagu, the Earl of Orford and John Somers. All, however, escaped punishment.

== Arguments over starting a war with Spain ==
Outspoken Tory reluctance to finance another war with Spain had mellowed by the end of the Parliament. The Whigs were very much in favour of war and persuaded the King of the need for another election that year. Parliament was thus dissolved on 11 November 1701 and another Parliament summoned later that month.

== Notable acts passed in the parliament ==
- Act of Settlement 1701
- British Museum Act 1700
- Plate Assay Act 1700

== See also ==
- List of acts of the 5th Parliament of King William III
- List of parliaments of England
