= Elthorne Hundred =

Historical division of Middlesex, England

Coordinates: 51.54°N 0.40°W

Location of the hundred in Middlesex.

Elthorne was a hundred (ancient subdivision) of the historic county of Middlesex, England.

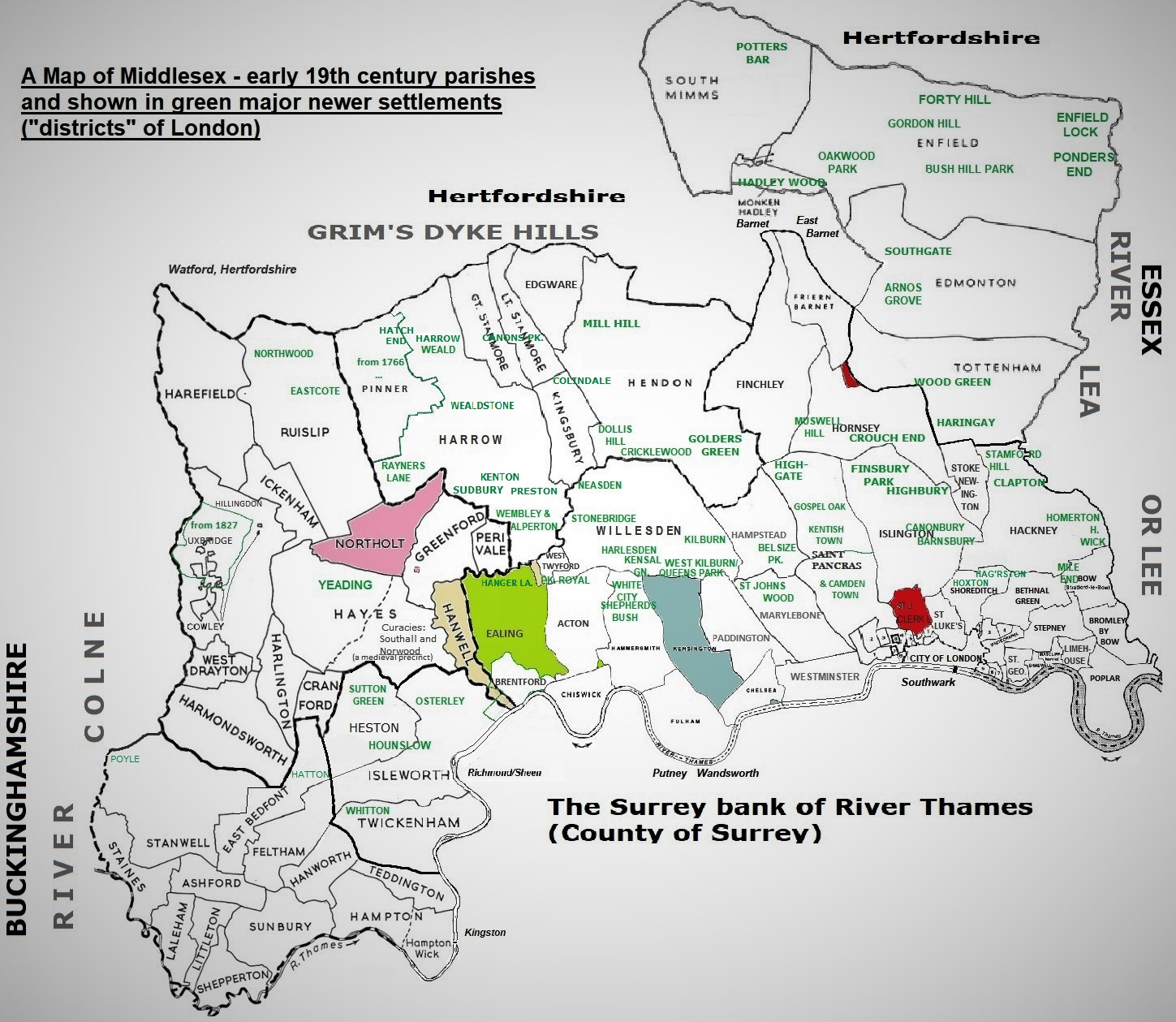
The parishes and major newer settlements in the Hundred. For some years until c.1880s reforms Northolt and Hanwell enjoyed small detached parts (exclaves). As to Northolt, in Greenford lay a small exclave and enclave of agricultural land, the smaller of which was 2.5 acres (expanded on map as too small to show), the larger, 47. Cowley completely consisted of enclaves in Hillingdon parish. Its parcels have therefore given way to a more workable modern definition, Cowley Peachey close to the site of its main manor.
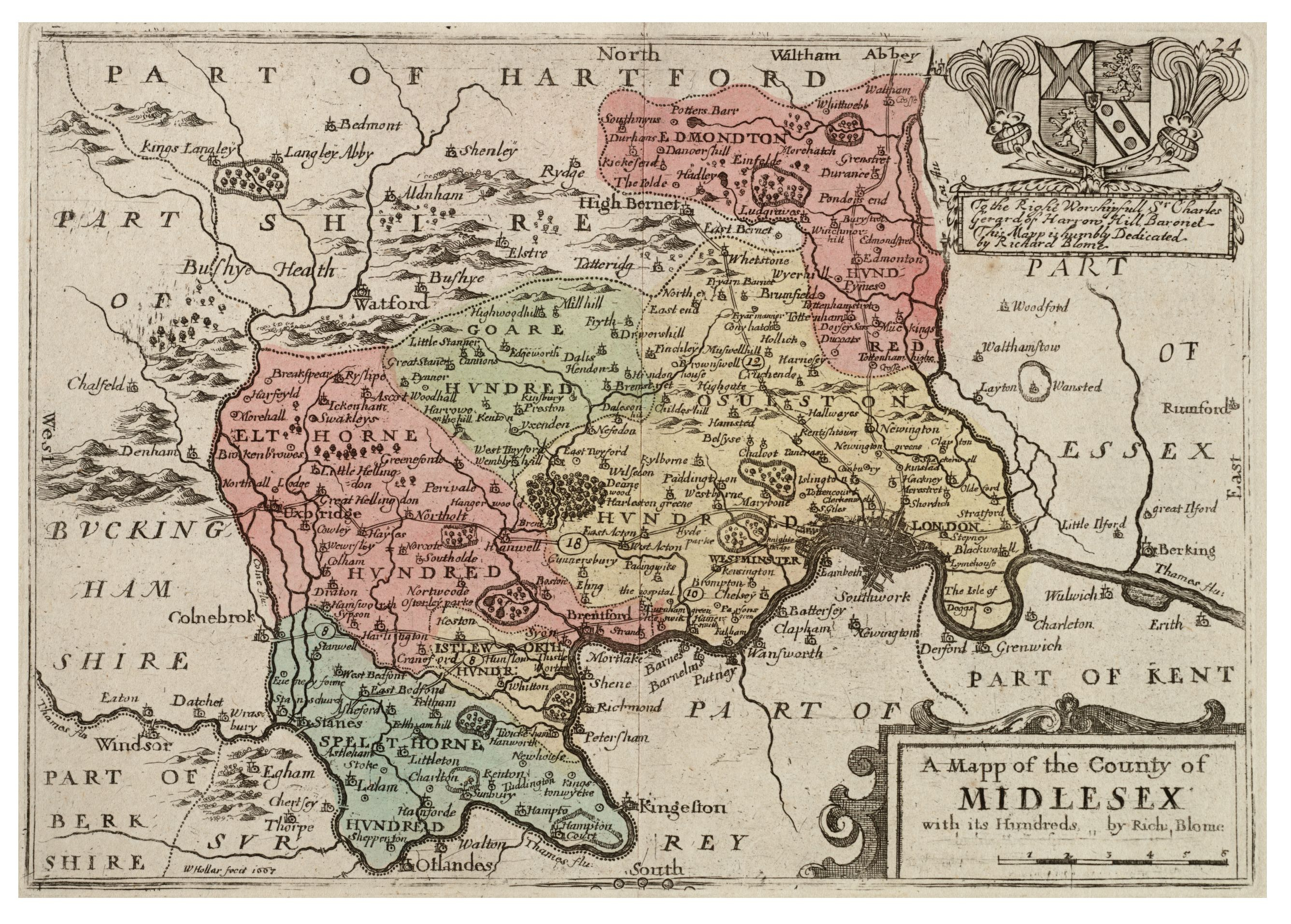
Non-geometric map of the county engraved by Wenceslaus Hollar (d.1677). The manors and villages shown are those seen as most notable. Not confined to those with a church, many of the then-largest estates or simply estates of greatest houses have become obsolete.

== Toponymy ==
The name is a standard contraction in Old English of El(ɘ's) thorn – El likely being a man, perhaps one of the eorls (earls) in the same way as Spelthorne Hundred, adjacent, and the thorn would accurately reflect that most of the land, like Hounslow Heath of today, until and unless manually cleared was covered or underlain as it naturally is here with hawthorns, blackthorns and brambles. The most distinctive of these is the sometimes tree-height genus, the hawthorn, which is in warm months heavy with small white flowers and is endemic to the local gravel-rich soil and banks of rivers across all England save for the north and south-west, where its larger type also extends to. Blackthorns are alongside hawthorns the ancient underlayer of the local Ten Acre Wood, an oak plantation. Antiquaries have suggested a meeting-point tree, in the same way as Ossulstone was a meeting point, however, in the same way as "broom" and "gorse" are used whether the noun refers to single thorn tree is unascertainable.

== Parishes ==
It was a north-west portion having these parishes:

- Cranford, and Harlington and West Drayton small parishes north of the south-west projection, Harmondsworth
- Harmondsworth, the far south-west projection. It as such covered most of the fields and former homes of Heathrow (hamlet) taken up to become London Heathrow Airport
- Greenford, between Northolt and Perivale in the east
- Hanwell, a strip parish east of Norwood Green. (Note: In the centuries until their powers were curtailed the Manorial Court of Boston Manor to the south-east gave suit to (was subject to the aegis of) the Hundred Court. The most built up part of the old manor immediately contributed to Brentford. Specifically the townspeople of New Brentford, founded around St Lawrence's Hospital in the old manorial land in 1179, were to worship at Hanwell on the four principal feasts and to be buried there, except the infirm, chaplains, and their servants. Offerings, tithes (but a smaller portion after c.1660) and an annual donation of wax went from the curate/curacy to the rector of Hanwell. Around 1660 New Brentford, already governed by its own vestry, was made a separate parish. In 1714 the rector of Hanwell managed to assert his right to the hay tithes from Boston manorial demesne but in 1744 he gave up the small tithes of New Brentford, all hay tithes except those from Boston demesne, and all offerings. In 1961 the parish of St. Lawrence, New Brentford, was amalgamated with St. George's and St. Paul's, Old Brentford to form the united parishes of Brentford in the Church of England.)
- Hayes, the south-east half of which was Norwood, a precinct from the founding of its 12th century chapel, then chapelry until its 1859 upgrade to a parish, during the early centuries seeing its Southall manor build up significantly and build its own community. The first mention of a priest in the precinct of Norwood is of Simon, the chaplain of Southall, in 1394. (Note: Southall has a rich array of non-Anglican places of worship. A Sikh temple on Southall Green opened in 1963. The gurdwara was moved to another site in Southall in 1967, the old site hosting the Roman Catholic church which had had a temporary succession of churches from 1903. At least 11 other denominations of churches since 1878 have served Southall and Norwood, an unusual number outsite of a city centre, partly reflecting the diverse nationalities of founders, such as in the Gospel Hall movement.)
  - Yeading developed late in the county in the north of Hayes proper (outside of the precinct). It saw its first mission church in 1890.
- Hillingdon, a large area, a fairly neat upright rectangle. The western parish with the main indent of the Colne, a braided river.
  - Cowley, a parish scattered about in Hillingdon parish
  - Uxbridge, a chapelry from before 1248 until an 1827 upgrade to a parish. It centred on the town in the west (Note: Liberally described in 1547 as a vicarage valued at £5)
  - Yiewsley, a chapelry founded on an old hamlet in 1859, made a parish in 1874
- Ickenham, a small parish north-east of Hillingdon and north-west of Hayes
- Northolt between Ruislip and Hayes (Note: From at least as early as the 18th century two detached areas of Northolt parish lay in Greenford. The larger area, comprising 47 a. was the west of Greenford village immediately north of the Ruislip road and west of Oldfield Lane. A further 2½ a., called Mill Field in 1775, lay along the southern boundary of Greenford. These detached parts were transferred to Greenford in 1882 and 1887.)
- Perivale, narrowly the bulk and extreme of the small eastern sub-projection
- Harefield, with Ruislip the northern projection
- Ruislip, with Harefield the northern projection. Parent parish of Eastcote and Northwood.

It thus closely corresponded to the present London Borough of Hillingdon, plus the western half of the London Borough of Ealing. The eastern third of Ealing is mainly Ealing and Acton which lay in Ossulstone Hundred.

== Simplification of complex shapes ==
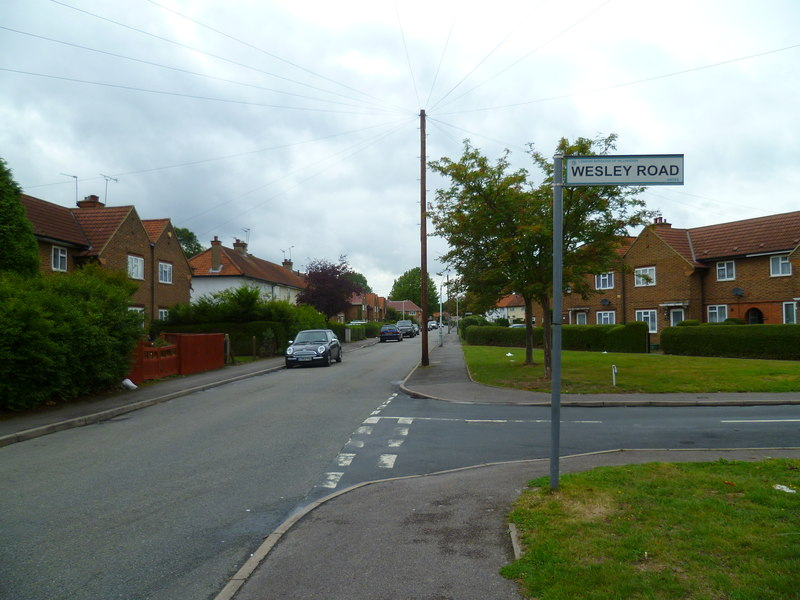
All adopted road street signs across Hillingdon pay regard to the normal, common consensus definition of each London district, much of which is based on the old and revised parishes and more particularly the secular Urban Districts and early ward electoral divisions which succeeded them in government.

Major roads and housing estates have simplified the borders of localities — as shown on each local street name sign in these boroughs. The complexity of many old parish borders of Elthorne hundred has been reduced. This is seen in the modern borders of the local Church of England ecclesiastical parishes, radically simplified. As to the smallest of old parishes most boundaries have greatly changed particularly Ickenham which has shifted west. Local councils have not gone so far as to redefine street signs on the basis of equal-electorate electoral wards. They locally take heed of a fusion of long history, wards and numbered postal districts.

== See also ==
- UB postcode area, a similar area but which excludes Ruislip and its progeny (particularly Eastcote and Northwood, see HA postcode area). Most of the UB numbered divisions are loosely based on the original parishes, redrawn for post service convenience. Harmondsworth by the 20th century attached to other Middlesex areas, such as the Staines Rural District which existed from 1894 to 1930. London Heathrow airport which took much of its area as well as parts of Hatton (a hamlet of East Bedfont) and Stanwell is in the TW postcode area under Hounslow post town.
