= European Payment Order =

Debt-collecting system in the European Union

The European Payment Order (EPO) is a system of cross-border debt-collecting methods established on 11 December 2006, used in the European Union.

== Uses ==
The European Payment Order is only available for cross-border cases. It allows for citizens and businesses to use a simple method to enforce uncontested payments. Small businesses in particular should benefit from the EPO since it provides a simple, cost-effective method of collecting payments from a multinational group of customers.

== Local law ==
Local debt-recovering systems work alongside the European Payment Order. Creditors can choose which system they wish to use. One of the biggest benefits of using the European Payment Order is that it is specifically designed to work in multinational scenarios.

== See also ==
- Debt collection
