= Plate Assay Act 1700 =

Act of the Parliament of England

Plate Assay Act 1700 (Note: The citation of this act by this short title was authorised by section 5 of, and the second schedule to, the Statute Law Revision Act 1948. Due to the repeal of those provisions, it is now authorised by section 19(2) of the Interpretation Act 1978.)
- Act of Parliament
- Parliament of England
- Long title: An Act for appointing Wardens and Assay Masters for assaying Wrought Plate in the Cities of York, Exeter, Bristol, Chester, and Norwich. (Note: These words are printed against this act in the second column of the second schedule to the Statute Law Revision Act 1948, which is headed "Title".)
- Citation: 12 & 13 Will. 3. c. 4
- Territorial extent: England and Wales

Dates
- Royal assent: 12 June 1701
- Commencement: 6 February 1701 (Note: Start of session.)
- Repealed: 24 May 1962
Other legislation
Repealed by	Assay Offices Act 1962

Status: Repealed

Text of statute as originally enacted

The Plate Assay Act 1700 (12 & 13 Will. 3. c. 4) was an act of the Parliament of England.

== Subsequent developments ==
The whole act was repealed by section 4(2)(b) of the Assay Offices Act 1962 (10 & 11 Eliz. 2. c. xvii), which came into force on 24 May 1962.
