= Spelthorne Hundred =

Administrative division of England

Coordinates: 51.43°N 0.41°W

Spelthorne
- Area
  - 1831: 23,386 acres (94.64 km^{2})
- Population
  - 1831: 15,212
  - 1881: 33,460
- History
  - Created: in late Anglo Saxon England
- Status: hundred
- Subdivisions
  - Type: Parishes containing manors, churchlands and commons. Henry VIII created the two royal parks in the eastern two parishes - Bushy Park and Hampton Court Park - and set up hunting rights and similar privileges across much of the hundred. By the 19th century all the commons were enclosed and only manor with its lands largely undivided was Hampton Court.

Spelthorne was a hundred (dated subdivision) of the historic county of Middlesex, England. It contained these parishes and settlements:

- Ashford
- East Bedfont
  - The hamlet of Hatton
- Feltham
- Hampton
  - The settlement of Hampton Hill developed in the 19th century
- Hampton Wick
- Hanworth
- Laleham
- Littleton since the 1970s contiguous with Shepperton
  - The chapelry of Astleham/Aslam. In the 1930s replaced with the Queen Mary Reservoir.
- Shepperton
- Staines
- Stanwell
  - The hamlet of Stanwell Moor, since the 20th century a village without a church
- Sunbury
  - The hamlet of Upper Halliford, today a village, joined postally with Shepperton
  - The hamlet of Charlton, joined postally with Shepperton
- Teddington
  - Part of the neighbourhood of Fulwell, once a single-ownership estate, by consensus spreading south to around to its railway station

The present-day district of Spelthorne in Surrey amounts to about 59% of the hundred. The eastern parts since 1965 form parts of the London boroughs of Hounslow and Richmond upon Thames.

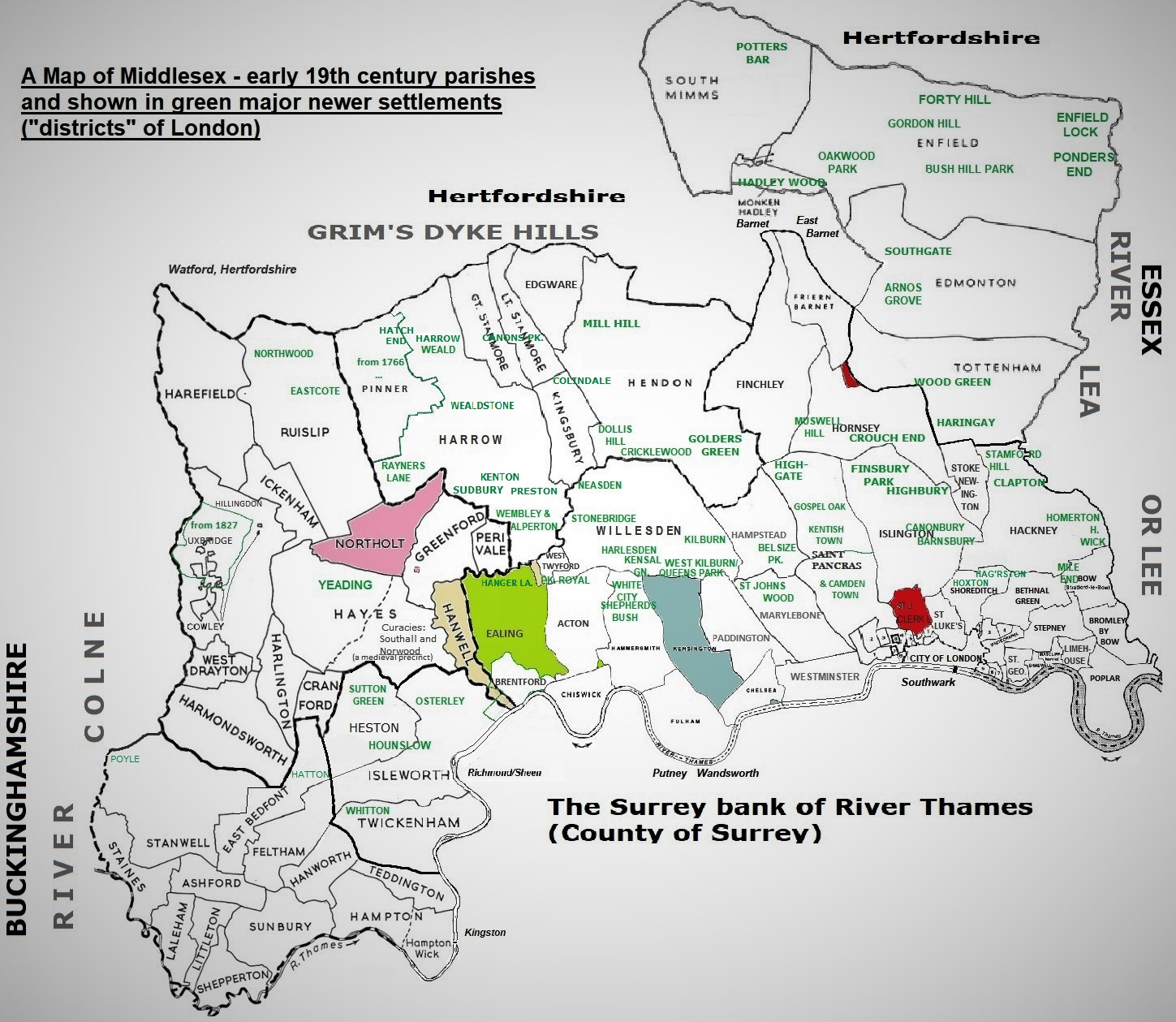
The parishes in the Hundred. These closely correspond with postcode districts.

== Demography ==
A decennial table for each parish is published in the Victoria County History series. By 1891 the Hundred was legally moribund, having already been de facto moribund. The population of the north-eastern six parishes has been greater than the south-west seven since an unknowable point in time between the 1831 and 1841 censuses. A summary is:

Area name	Acreage	1801 population	1821 population	1841 population	1861 population	1881 population	1901 population
Seven parishes becoming in 1965 part of Surrey	13,733	5604	6720	7915	9152	14520	20888
Six parishes becoming in 1965 part of London	9,653	4624	6697	8672	10288	18940	32280
Total (Spelthorne Hundred)	23,386	10288	13417	16587	19440	33460	53168

Relative to the county as a whole, the hundred (one of six) had 12.9% of its 181,320 acres. In 1801 it had 1.3% of the 818,129 people recorded as living in Middlesex; in 1901 it had 1.6% of the 3,585,323 people stated in the census to be living in the county (including in the County of London parts which once lay in Middlesex).

== See also ==
- TW postcode area, the centre-west bulk of which corresponds with Spelthorne Hundred. It adds Richmond, Brentford, Isleworth Hundred (or half-hundred) and Egham
- Spelthorne (UK Parliament constituency), a seat of the House of Commons since 1918 which was initially larger and is since 1945 smaller than the Hundred.
