= Register of Judgments, Orders and Fines =

Statutory register in England and Wales

The Register of Judgment, Orders and Fines is a statutory register in England and Wales that maintains a record of:

- Judgments entered in the High Court;
- Judgments entered in the County Court;
- Administration orders made under section 112 of the County Courts Act 1984;
- Orders restricting enforcement made under section 112A of that Act;
- Sums which are, for the purposes of the 1980 Act, sums adjudged to be paid by a conviction or order of a magistrates' court.

== History ==
The Register of County Court Judgments was established by Parliament in 1852, originally maintained by the Lord Chancellor's Department, until it was transferred to Registry Trust in 1985. Details of administration orders made against individuals in county courts were added from 1993, and details of Child Support Agency liability orders were added from 1997.

The Courts Act 2003 extended the register to include High Court judgments from 6 April 2006, and renamed it the Register of Judgments, Orders and Fines. Enforced tribunal awards for money against individuals and companies have been added since 1 April 2009.

The register is currently regulated by the Register of Judgments, Orders and Fines Regulations 2005 as amended by the Register of Judgments, Orders and Fines (Amendments) Regulations 2009.

== Registry Trust ==
The register is operated by Registry Trust Limited on behalf of the Ministry of Justice. Registry Trust was originally established in 1985 by the predecessor of the Ministry of Justice, the Lord Chancellor's Department, and is a not-for-profit company that is entirely independent of the government. Prior to that date, the register was run by the Lord Chancellor's Department directly, but was proving costly to maintain. As the register is crucial for performing credit-worthiness checks, the government transferred operation to an independent and self-financing organisation, Registry Trust.

Registry Trust also operate similar registers for Scotland, the Republic of Ireland, Northern Ireland, the Isle of Man and Jersey.
